= 2012 BK Häcken season =

BK Häcken
2012 season
- Chairman: (Sweden) Sabine Söndergaard
- Manager: (Sweden) Peter Gerhardsson

In 2012 BK Häcken finished second in the Allsvenskan championship and were eliminated from the Svenska Cupen at the group stage.

== 2012 season squad ==
Statistics prior to season start only

Squad Season 2012
No.	Player	Nat.	Birthdate	At BK Häcken since	Previous club	League matches in BK Häcken	League goals in BK Häcken
Goalkeepers
1	Christoffer Källqvist	(Sweden)	26 August 1983	2001	Youth Team	233	0
26	Damir Mehić	(Bosnia and Herzegovina)	18 April 1987	2009	Gunnilse IS	4	0
Defenders
3	Mattias Östberg	(Sweden)	24 August 1977	2008	GAIS	99	5
4	Mohammed Ali Khan	(Sweden)	21 January 1986	2009	Västra Frölunda	27	0
5	Emil Wahlström	(Sweden)	2 March 1987	2006	Youth Team	90	1
15	Kari Arkivuo	(Finland)	23 June 1983	2011	Go Ahead Eagles	30	2
16	Tibor Joza	(Sweden)	10 August 1986	2011	Falkenbergs FF	14	0
17	Björn Anklev	(Sweden)	13 April 1979	2011	Örgryte IS	10	1
22	Daniel Forsell	(Sweden)	4 January 1982	2001	Youth Team	143	1
27	Tom Söderberg	(Sweden)	25 August 1987	2006	Youth Team	68	5
Midfielders
6	David Frölund	(Sweden)	4 June 1979	2005	Örgryte IS	150	3
7	Jonas Bjurström	(Sweden)	24 March 1979	2009	Trelleborgs FF	41	5
8	Josef Elvby	(Sweden)	13 July 1982	2009	Qviding FIF	75	6
10	Andreas Drugge	(Sweden)	20 January 1983	2012	IFK Göteborg	0	0
11	Andrés Vasquez	(Sweden)	16 July 1987	2011	FC Zürich	8	0
12	Oscar Lewicki	(Sweden)	14 July 1992	2011	Bayern Munich	0	0
14	Martin Ericsson	(Sweden)	4 September 1980	2012	IF Elfsborg	0	0
19	Leonard Zuta	(Sweden)	9 August 1992	2012	Youth Team	0	0
20	Dominic Chatto	(Nigeria)	7 December 1985	2009	Inter Turku	70	1
21	Jonas Henriksson	(Sweden)	29 December 1976	2005	IFK Göteborg	191	57
24	René Makondele	(Democratic Republic of the Congo)	20 April 1982	2010	Helsingborgs IF	41	9
Forwards
9	Dioh Williams	(Liberia)	4 January 1984	2011	AGF Aarhus	142 (Note: Matches and goals from earlier spell with the club included)	57
18	Majeed Waris	(Ghana)	19 September 1991	2010	Right to Dream Academy	26	3
23	Joel Johansson	(Sweden)	16 January 1986	2012	IF Elfsborg	0	0
29	Eddie Hernández	(Honduras)	7 February 1991	2012	C.D. Platense	0	0
Last updated: 17 April 2012

== Transfers ==
=== In ===
No.	Pos.	Nat.	Name	Age	EU	Moving from	Type	Transfer window	Ends	Transfer fee	Source
	MF	(Sweden)	Drugge	29	EU	IFK Göteborg	Transfer	Winter		N/A	IFK Göteborg
	FW	(Honduras)	Hernández	21	Non-EU	Platense (Honduras)	Loan	Winter		N/A	BK Häcken
	MF	(Sweden)	Ericsson	31	EU	IF Elfsborg	Loan	Winter		N/A	IF Elfsborg
	FW	(Sweden)	Johansson	26	EU	IF Elfsborg	Loan	Winter		N/A	GP.se

=== Out ===
No.	Pos.	Nat.	Name	Age	EU	Moving to	Type	Transfer window	Transfer fee	Source
	MF	(Sweden)	Nyström	27	EU	Halmstads BK	Transfer	Winter		Halmstads BK
	MF	(Sweden)	Frick	21	EU		Contract ended	Winter		Halmstads BK
	FW	(Brazil)	Maranhão	19	EU	Cruzeiro (Brazil)	Transfer	Winter		GP.se
	DF	(Sweden)	Janevski	19	EU	FC Trollhättan	Transfer	Winter		FC Trollhättan

Last updated: 18 April 2012

== Appearances and goals ==
As of 25 May 2012

No.	Pos	Nat	Player	Total		Allsvenskan		Svenska Cupen	
No.	Pos	Nat	Player	Apps	Goals	Apps	Goals	Apps	Goals
1	GK	(Sweden) SWE	Christoffer Källqvist	12	0	12	0	0	0
3	DF	(Sweden) SWE	Mattias Östberg	11	1	11	1	0	0
4	DF	(Sweden) SWE	Mohammed Ali Khan	11	0	11	0	0	0
5	DF	(Sweden) SWE	Emil Wahlström	0	0	0	0	0	0
6	MF	(Sweden) SWE	David Frölund	8	0	8	0	0	0
7	MF	(Sweden) SWE	Jonas Bjurström	0	0	0	0	0	0
8	MF	(Sweden) SWE	Josef Elvby	6	0	6	0	0	0
9	FW	(Liberia) LBR	Dioh Williams	9	0	9	0	0	0
10	MF	(Sweden) SWE	Andreas Drugge	9	1	9	1	0	0
11	MF	(Sweden) SWE	Andrés Vasquez	0	0	0	0	0	0
12	MF	(Sweden) SWE	Oscar Lewicki	10	0	10	0	0	0
14	MF	(Sweden) SWE	Martin Ericsson	11	2	11	2	0	0
15	MF	(Finland) FIN	Kari Arkivuo	8	0	8	0	0	0
16	DF	(Sweden) SWE	Tibor Joza	0	0	0	0	0	0
17	DF	(Sweden) SWE	Björn Anklev	12	2	12	2	0	0
18	FW	(Ghana) GHA	Waris Majeed	12	12	12	12	0	0
19	MF	(Sweden) SWE	Leonard Zuta	1	0	1	0	0	0
20	MF	(Nigeria) NGR	Dominic Chatto	11	0	11	0	0	0
21	MF	(Sweden) SWE	Jonas Henriksson	0	0	0	0	0	0
22	DF	(Sweden) SWE	Daniel Forsell	6	0	6	0	0	0
23	FW	(Sweden) SWE	Joel Johansson	5	0	5	0	0	0
24	MF	(Democratic Republic of the Congo) COD	René Makondele	12	8	12	8	0	0
25	FW	(Sweden) SWE	Jesper Westermark (Note: Youth squad player)	2	0	2	0	0	0
26	GK	(Bosnia and Herzegovina) BIH	Damir Mehić	0	0	0	0	0	0
27	MF	(Sweden) SWE	Tom Söderberg	11	2	11	2	0	0
27	FW	(Honduras) HON	Eddie Hernández	0	0	0	0	0	0

== Matches ==
=== Pre-season/friendlies ===
19 January 2012 Match 1	BK Häcken	1–2	GAIS
21:00 CET		(report) (in Swedish)

21 January 2012 Match 2	Sörlandslaget	1–1	BK Häcken
15:00 CET		(report) (in Swedish)

22 January 2012 Match 3	(Norway) IK Start	1–2	BK Häcken
15:30 CET		(report) (in Swedish)

4 February 2012 Match 4	(Denmark) Lyngby	3–1	BK Häcken	Copenhagen
13:15 CET		(report) (in Swedish)

7 February 2012 Match 5	BK Häcken	1–0	Halmstads BK	Valhalla IP, Gothenburg
17:00 CET	Williams 61'	(report) (in Swedish)		Referee: Antti Kanerva

10 February 2012 Match 6	BK Häcken	2–1	Assyriska	Valhalla IP, Gothenburg
17:00 CET	Williams 59'; Waris 80'	(report) (in Swedish)	63' Thorstensson

14 February 2012 Match 7	IF Elfsborg	0–0	BK Häcken	Borås Arena, Borås
18:00 CET		(report) (in Swedish)

25 February 2012 Match 8	BK Häcken	1–1	(United States) FC Dallas	World of Sports, Florida, United States
02:00 CET	Waris 80'	(report) (in Swedish)	Castillo

28 February 2012 Match 9	(United States) Toronto FC	3–1	BK Häcken	Orlando, Florida, United States
01:00 CET		(report) (in Swedish)

2 March 2012 Match 10	(United States) Orlando City	1–3	BK Häcken	Orlando, Florida, United States
02:00 CET		(report) (in Swedish)

10 March 2012 Match 11	BK Häcken	3–0	Varbergs BoIS	Valhalla IP, Gothenburg
15:00 CET		(report) (in Swedish)

13 March 2012 Match 12	BK Häcken	0–1	Jönköpings Södra	Valhalla IP, Gothenburg
17:00 CET		(report) (in Swedish)

20 March 2012 Match 13	BK Häcken	1–0	Ljungskile SK	Valhalla IP, Gothenburg
16:00 CET		(report) (in Swedish)

24 March 2012 Match 14	Malmö FF	4–2	BK Häcken	Swedbank Stadion, Malmö
16:00 CET		(report) (in Swedish)

=== Allsvenskan ===
31 March 2012 Round 1	GAIS	0–0	BK Häcken	Gamla Ullevi, Gothenburg
16:00 CEST	Wánderson (yellow card) 8'	(report) (in Swedish)	(yellow card) 29' Lewicki; (yellow card) 78' Ali Khan; (yellow card) 90+3' Söderberg	Attendance: 9 561; Referee: Markus Strömbergsson

7 April 2012 Round 2	BK Häcken	5–0	Malmö FF	Rambergsvallen, Gothenburg
14:00 CEST	Anklev 5'; Östberg (yellow card) 21'; Majeed 24', 49'; Makondele 43', 84'	(report) (in Swedish)	(yellow card) 26' Durmaz; (yellow card) 56' Vinzents	Attendance: 4 108; Referee: Michael Lerjéus

12 April 2012 Round 3	BK Häcken	4–2	Mjällby AIF	Rambergsvallen, Gothenburg
19:00 CEST	Makondele 26'; Söderberg 43'; Waris 57', 77'	(report) (in Swedish)	(yellow card) 7' Rosengren; 44' Ericsson; 70' Kivuvu; (yellow card) 74' Wikström	Attendance: 2 471; Referee: Martin Hansson

16 April 2012 Round 4	Kalmar FF	3–1	BK Häcken	Guldfågeln Arena, Kalmar
19:00 CEST	Dauda 14', 28', 61'	(report) (in Swedish)	(yellow card) 65' Lewicki; 68' Söderberg; (yellow card) 75' Ericsson; (yellow card) 90+2' Östberg	Attendance: 5 051; Referee: Johan Hamlin

23 April 2012 Round 5	BK Häcken	1–2	IFK Göteborg	Rambergsvallen, Gothenburg
19:00 CEST	Östberg 5' (yellow card) 64'; Khan (yellow card) 84'; Makondele (yellow card) 90+4'	(report) (in Swedish)	(yellow card) 32' Salomonsson; 68' (yellow card) 75' Sana; 85' (pen.) Selaković; (yellow card) 89' Allansson	Attendance: 6 040; Referee: Jonas Eriksson

28 April 2012 Round 6	Syrianska FC	1–2	BK Häcken	Södertälje Fotbollsarena, Södertälje
14:00 CEST	Pereira (yellow card) 21'; Chanko 59'; Michel (yellow card) 90'; Skenderović (yellow card) 90+4' (yellow-red card) 90+5'	(report) (in Swedish)	(yellow card) 21' Lewicki; 43' Ericsson; 90+3' Makondele	Attendance: 1 860; Referee: Björn Lindroth

2 May 2012 Round 7	Åtvidabergs FF	0–3	BK Häcken	Kopparvallen, Åtvidaberg
19:00 CEST	Eriksson (yellow card) 76' da Silva (yellow card) 77'	(report) (in Swedish)	25' Makondele; (yellow card) 39' Khan; 54' Drugge; (yellow card) 79' Arkivuo; (yellow card) 84' Anklev; 87' Majeed	Attendance: 3 620; Referee: Martin Strömbergsson

10 May 2012 Round 8	BK Häcken	3–0	Gefle	Rambergsvallen, Gothenburg
19:00 CEST	Makondele 17', 45+1'; Majeed 36'	(report) (in Swedish)	(yellow card) 25' Faltsetas	Attendance: 1 862; Referee: Michael Lerjéus

13 May 2012 Round 9	Helsingborgs IF	3–2	BK Häcken	Olympia, Helsingborg
17:30 CEST	Hanstveit (yellow card) 29'; Finnbogason 32'; Nordmark 45+2', 62'	(report) (in Swedish)	35' Anklev; 58' Majeed; (yellow card) 69' Makondele; (yellow card) 77' Forsell	Attendance: 10 038; Referee: Andreas Ekberg

16 May 2012 Round 10	BK Häcken	6–0	IFK Norrköping	Rambergsvallen, Gothenburg
19:00 CEST	Majeed 15', 30', 44', 52', 66'; Ericsson 45+1'	(report) (in Swedish)	(yellow card) 41' Ajdarević	Attendance: 2 518; Referee: Daniel Stålhammar

20 May 2012 Round 11	BK Häcken	1–1	Djurgårdens IF	Rambergsvallen, Gothenburg
15:00 CEST	Frölund (yellow card) 56'; Makondele 72'	(report) (in Swedish)	Santos 58'	Attendance: 3 422; Referee: Johan Hamlin

24 May 2012 Round 12	IF Elfsborg	2–0	BK Häcken	Borås Arena, Borås
19:00 CEST	Ishizaki 6'; Hiljemark (yellow card) 29'; Nilsson (yellow card) 72' (goal) 81' (pen.); Elm (yellow card) 88'	(report) (in Swedish)	(yellow card) 45' Elvby; (yellow card) 45+2' Khan; (yellow card) 62' (yellow-red card) 90' Chatto; (yellow card) 69' Majeed	Attendance: 9 744; Referee: Tobias Mattsson

30 June 2012 Round 13	BK Häcken	1 – 2	GIF Sundsvall	Rambergsvallen, Gothenburg
16:00 CEST	Khan (yellow card) 16'; Lewicki (yellow card) 53'; Makondele (yellow card) 83'; Ericsson 85' (pen.)	Report	25' Helg; 35' (yellow card) 90+3' Holster	Attendance: 1,968; Referee: Andreas Ekberg

8 July 2012 Round 14	AIK	3 – 1	BK Häcken	Råsunda Stadium, Solna
16:00 CEST	Borges 3', 57'; Quaison 5'; Lundberg (yellow card) 41'; Atakora (yellow card) 76'; Kamara (yellow card) 90+3'	Report	6' Waris Majeed; (yellow card) 85' Drugge; (yellow card) 90+2' Chatto	Attendance: 9,383; Referee: Daniel Stalhammar

15 July 2012 Round 15	Örebro SK	1 – 2	BK Häcken	Behrn Arena, Örebro
16:00 CEST	Grahn (yellow card) 11'; Haginge (yellow card) 44'; Wowoah (yellow card) 58'; Astvald 72'	Report	55' Williams; 57' Makondele; (yellow card) 79' Anklev; (yellow card) 90+1' Waris Majeed	Attendance: 6,023; Referee: Magnus Ahlsèn

22 July 2012 Round 16	BK Häcken	2 – 1	Örebro SK	Rambergsvallen, Gothenburg
16:00 CEST	Arkivuo (yellow card) 18'; Makondele 22' (yellow card) 67'; Söderberg (yellow card) 73' (yellow-red card) 83'; Johansson 87'	Report	5' Lumbana	Attendance: 8,574; Referee: Martin Strömbergsson

30 July 2012 Round 17	BK Häcken	3 – 1	GAIS	Rambergsvallen, Gothenburg
19:00 CEST	Ericsson 41' 89' (pen.); Chatto (yellow card) 49'; Waris Majeed 90+8' (yellow card) 90+9'	Report	26' Romarinho; (yellow card) 47' Johansson; (yellow card) 60' Wánderson; (yellow card) 88' Sillanpää	Attendance: 5,606; Referee: Martin Hansson

5 August 2012 Round 18	Malmö FF	0 – 0	BK Häcken	Swedbank Stadion, Malmö
16:00 CEST	Wílton Figueiredo (yellow card) 55'; Halsti (red card) 61'	Report	(yellow card) 43' Williams; (yellow card) 81' Söderberg	Attendance: 14,368; Referee: Daniel Stalhammar

12 August 2012 Round 19	IFK Norrköping	1 – 2	BK Häcken	Idrottsparken, Norrköping
17:30 CEST	Smedberg Dalence 47'; Tkalčić (yellow card) 67'; Skjønsberg (yellow card) 83'	Summary	12' Anklev; (yellow card) 23' Lewicki; 60' Söderberg	Attendance: 4,504; Referee: Johan Hamlin

26 August 2012 Round 20	BK Häcken	4 – 2	IF Elfsborg	Rambergsvallen, Gothenburg
17:30 CEST	Waris Majeed (yellow card) 8' (goal) 90'; Lewicki (yellow card) 43'; Anklev 58'; Mohammed 71', 76'; Chatto (yellow card) 84'; Makondele (yellow card) 86'	Summary	7' (yellow card) 37' Elm; (yellow card) 10' (yellow-red card) 82' Jönsson; (yellow card) 40' Augustsson; 60' Rohdén	Attendance: 6,040; Referee: Markus Strömbergsson

31 August 2012 Round 21	BK Häcken	5 – 2	Åtvidabergs FF	Rambergsvallen, Gothenburg
19:00 CEST	Makondele 37', 71'; Waris Majeed 58', 82'; Mohammed 64'	Summary	50' Abubakari; 90' Mete	Attendance: 3,407; Referee: Martin Strömbergsson

17 September 2012 Round 22	Gefle IF	0 – 2	BK Häcken	Strömvallen, Gävle
19:00 CEST	Adukor (yellow card) 82'	Report	53' Waris; 70' Mohammed	Attendance: 3,602; Referee: Andreas Ekberg

21 September 2012 Round 23	Djurgårdens IF	0 – 3	BK Häcken	Stockholm Olympic Stadium, Stockholm
19:00 CEST	Sjölund (yellow card) 56'; Keene (yellow card) 65'	Report	35' Anklev; 54' Williams; 81' Waris; (yellow card) 87' Chatto	Attendance: 5,594; Referee: Tobias Mattsson

27 September 2012 Round 24	BK Häcken	2 – 2	Helsingborgs IF	Rambergsvallen, Gothenburg
18:00 CEST	Williams 3', 74'	Report	33' (yellow card) 38' Accam; 88' Đurđić	Attendance: 4,368; Referee: Michael Lerjeus

1 October 2012 Round 25	IFK Göteborg	1 – 1	BK Häcken	Gamla Ullevi, Gothenburg
19:00 CEST	Farnerud (yellow card) 43'; Salomonsson (yellow card) 47'; Bjärsmyr (yellow card) 65'; Stiller 71'; Wæhler (yellow card) 89'	Summary	Bjurström (yellow card) 18' (yellow-red card) 64'; Ericsson 35'	Attendance: 10,333; Referee: Martin Hansson

6 October 2012 Round 26	BK Häcken	5 – 1	Syrianska FC	Rambergsvallen, Gothenburg
14:00	Waris 41', 64' (pen.), 84'; Ericsson 45', 82'	Report (in Swedish)	Massi 88'; Bååth (yellow card) 65'	Attendance: 3,524; Referee: Johan Hamlin

20 October 2012 Round 27	Mjällby AIF	1 – 2	BK Häcken	Strandvallen, Hällevik
16:00	Radetinac 45+1'	Report	Khan 1'; Ivanovski 41' (o.g.)	Attendance: 3,310; Referee: Johan Hamlin

27 October 2012 Round 28	BK Häcken	1 – 2	Kalmar FF	Rambergsvallen, Gothenburg
14:00	Williams 20'	Report	Frölund 69' (o.g.); Dauda 72'	Attendance: 5,563; Referee: Jonas Eriksson (referee)

1 November 2012 Round 29	BK Häcken	1 – 1	AIK	Rambergsvallen, Gothenburg
20:00	Lewicki 14' (yellow card) 75'; Wahlström (yellow card) 19'; Anklev (yellow card) 54'	Summary	Daníelsson 45' (yellow card) 83'; Karlsson (yellow card) 58'	Attendance: 5,753; Referee: Stefan Johannesson

4 November 2012 Round 30	GIF Sundsvall	1 – 2	BK Häcken	Norrporten Arena, Sundsvall
15:00	Holster 69'	Summary	Waris Majeed 48'; Makondele (yellow card) 70'; Frölund (yellow card) 79'; Söderberg 83'	Attendance: 2,689; Referee: Martin Strömbergson

=== Svenska cupen ===
19 August 2012 Round 2	Åkarps IF	0 - 3	BK Häcken	Åkarp
17:00		Summary	Waris Majeed 12', 31'; Khan (yellow card) 35'; Ericsson 66'	Stadium: Åkarps IP; Attendance: 579; Referee: Andreas Ekberg

== Competitions ==
=== Allsvenskan ===
==== Standings ====
Pos	Team	Pld	W	D	L	GF	GA	GD	Pts	Qualification or relegation
1	IF Elfsborg (C)	30	18	5	7	48	29	+19	59	Qualification to Champions League second qualifying round
2	BK Häcken	30	17	6	7	67	36	+31	57	Qualification to Europa League second qualifying round
3	Malmö FF	30	16	8	6	49	33	+16	56	Qualification to Europa League first qualifying round
4	AIK	30	15	10	5	41	27	+14	55	
5	IFK Norrköping	30	15	7	8	50	43	+7	52	

Source: svenskfotboll.se (in Swedish)
Rules for classification: 1) points; 2) goal difference; 3) number of goals scored.
(C) Champions

==== Results summary ====
Overall								Home						Away					
Pld	W	D	L	GF	GA	GD	Pts	W	D	L	GF	GA	GD	W	D	L	GF	GA	GD
30	17	6	7	67	38	+29	57	9	3	3	44	19	+25	8	3	4	23	19	+4

Last updated: 4 November 2012.
Source: SvFF.se (in Swedish)

==== Results by round ====
Round	1	2	3	4	5	6	7	8	9	10	11	12	13	14	15	16	17	18	19	20	21	22	23	24	25	26	27	28	29	30
Ground	A	H	H	A	H	A	A	H	A	H	H	A	H	A	A	H	H	A	A	H	H	A	A	H	A	H	A	H	H	A
Result	D	W	W	L	L	W	W	W	L	W	D	L	L	L	W	W	W	D	W	W	W	W	W	D	D	W	W	L	D	W
Position	7	3	2	4	7	3	2	2	3	3	3	4	4	4	2	2	2	2	2	2	2	2	1	1	2	2	2	2	2	2

Updated to match(es) played on 4 November 2012. Source: SvFF.se (in Swedish)
A = Away; H = Home; W = Win; D = Draw; L = Loss

== Season statistics ==
=== Superettan ===
Name	Matches	Goals
(Ghana) Waris Majeed	12	12
(Democratic Republic of the Congo) René Makondele	12	8
(Sweden) Tom Söderberg	11	2
(Sweden) Björn Anklev	12	2
(Sweden) Martin Ericsson	11	2
(Sweden) Mattias Östberg	11	1
(Sweden) Andreas Drugge	9	1

Name	Yellow card	Yellow card Red card	Red card
(Sweden) Mohammed Ali Khan	4	0	0
(Nigeria) Dominic Chatto	0	0	1
(Sweden) Mattias Östberg	3	0	0
(Sweden) Oscar Lewicki	3	0	0
(Democratic Republic of the Congo) René Makondele	2	0	0
(Sweden) Martin Ericsson	1	0	0
(Sweden) Tom Söderberg	1	0	0
(Finland) Kari Arkivuo	1	0	0
(Sweden) Björn Anklev	1	0	0
(Ghana) Waris Majeed	1	0	0
(Sweden) David Frölund	1	0	0
(Sweden) David Frölund	1	0	0
(Sweden) Josef Elvby	1	0	0

= Number of bookings
= Number of sending offs after a second yellow card
= Number of sending offs by a direct red card
