= 2015 BK Häcken season =

BK Häcken
2015 season
- Chairman: Lennart Karlsson
- Head coach: Peter Gerhardsson
- Stadium: Gamla Ullevi (to July); Bravida Arena (from July)
- Allsvenskan: 7th
- 2014–15 Svenska Cupen: Semi-finals

The 2015 season was BK Häcken's 75th in existence, their 15th season in Allsvenskan and their seventh consecutive season in the league. They competed in Allsvenskan where they finished seventh and in Svenska Cupen where they were knocked out in the semi-finals.

== Players ==
=== Squad information ===
As of 31 October 2015

Note: Flags indicate national team as defined under FIFA eligibility rules; some limited exceptions apply. Players may hold more than one non-FIFA nationality.

No.	Pos.	Nation	Player
1	GK	(Sweden) SWE	Christoffer Källqvist (vice captain)
3	DF	(Sweden) SWE	Jasmin Sudić
4	DF	(South Africa) RSA	Keagan Dolly
5	DF	(Sweden) SWE	Emil Wahlström
6	DF	(Sweden) SWE	David Frölund
7	MF	(Netherlands) NED	Niels Vorthoren
8	MF	(Sweden) SWE	Ivo Pękalski
9	FW	(Kosovo) KOS	Dardan Rexhepi
11	FW	(Brazil) BRA	Paulinho
12	MF	(Ghana) GHA	Mohammed Abubakari
13	MF	(Sweden) SWE	Sebastian Ohlsson
14	MF	(Sweden) SWE	Martin Ericsson (captain)
15	DF	(Finland) FIN	Kari Arkivuo

No.	Pos.	Nation	Player
17	MF	(Sweden) SWE	Gustav Berggren
18	FW	(Sweden) SWE	Alexander Jeremejeff
20	DF	(Sweden) SWE	Tom Söderberg
21	MF	(Ghana) GHA	Nasiru Mohammed
22	MF	(Sweden) SWE	Samuel Gustafson
23	DF	(Sweden) SWE	Simon Sandberg
24	MF	(Democratic Republic of the Congo) COD	René Makondele
25	DF	(Sweden) SWE	Egzon Binaku
26	GK	(Sweden) SWE	Peter Abrahamsson
27	MF	(Sweden) SWE	Joel Andersson
28	MF	(Sweden) SWE	Adam Andersson
29	GK	(Sweden) SWE	Alexander Nadj
31	FW	(Netherlands) NED	Michiel Hemmen

== Competitions ==
=== Allsvenskan ===
==== League table ====
Pos	Team	Pld	W	D	L	GF	GA	GD	Pts	Qualification or relegation
5	Malmö FF	30	15	9	6	54	34	+20	54	
6	Djurgårdens IF	30	14	9	7	52	37	+15	51	
7	BK Häcken	30	13	6	11	45	39	+6	45	Qualification for the Europa League second qualifying round (Note: BK Häcken qualified for the Europa League second qualifying round by winning the 2015–16 Svenska Cupen.)
8	Helsingborgs IF	30	11	4	15	43	45	−2	37	
9	Örebro SK	30	9	10	11	36	50	−14	37	

Source: svenskfotboll.se (in Swedish)
Rules for classification: 1) Points; 2) Goal difference; 3) Goals scored; 4) Head-to-head points; 5) Head-to-head goal difference; 6) Head-to-head away goals scored; 7) Play-off
(Note: Play-off is only played if need to decide champion, teams for relegation or UEFA competition and will be played on a neutral ground).

==== Results summary ====
Overall								Home						Away					
Pld	W	D	L	GF	GA	GD	Pts	W	D	L	GF	GA	GD	W	D	L	GF	GA	GD
30	13	6	11	45	39	+6	45	8	4	3	30	17	+13	5	2	8	15	22	−7

Source: svenskfotboll.se (in Swedish)

==== Results by round ====
Round	1	2	3	4	5	6	7	8	9	10	11	12	13	14	15	16	17	18	19	20	21	22	23	24	25	26	27	28	29	30
Ground	A	H	A	H	A	H	A	H	A	H	A	A	H	H	A	H	H	A	H	A	H	A	H	A	H	A	A	H	H	A
Result	L	D	D	L	W	L	W	W	W	L	L	D	D	W	L	D	W	L	D	L	W	L	W	L	W	W	L	W	W	W
Position	14	11	12	14	12	12	9	8	7	7	8	8	9	7	7	8	8	9	9	9	8	8	8	9	7	7	7	7	7	7

Source: see below
A = Away; H = Home; W = Win; D = Draw; L = Loss
