= 2012 Allsvenskan =

88th season of Allsvenskan

Allsvenskan
- Season: 2012
- Champions: IF Elfsborg; 6th Allsvenskan title 6th Swedish title overall
- Relegated: GIF Sundsvall; Örebro SK; GAIS
- Champions League: IF Elfsborg
- Europa League: BK Häcken; Malmö FF; IFK Göteborg; Gefle IF
- Matches played: 240
- Goals scored: 649 (2.7 per match)
- Top goalscorer: Waris Majeed (23 goals)
- Biggest home win: BK Häcken 6–0 IFK Norrköping
- Biggest away win: GIF Sundsvall 0–4 IFK Norrköping
- Highest scoring: Helsingborgs IF 7–2 Kalmar FF; IFK Norrköping 7–2 GAIS
- Longest winning run: 7 games IF Elfsborg
- Longest unbeaten run: 16 games Djurgårdens IF
- Longest winless run: 25 games GAIS
- Longest losing run: 7 games GAIS
- Highest attendance: 30,857; Djurgårdens IF 0–3 AIK
- Lowest attendance: 1,476; Syrianska FC 1–0 Gefle IF
- Average attendance: 7,210

The 2012 Allsvenskan, part of the 2012 Swedish football season, was the 88th season of Allsvenskan since its establishment in 1924. The 2012 fixtures were released on 12 December 2011. The season started on 31 March 2012 and ended on 4 November 2012. There was a five-week-long break between 24 May and 30 June during the UEFA Euro 2012. Helsingborgs IF were the defending champions, having won their fifth Swedish championship and their seventh Allsvenskan title the previous season.

IF Elfsborg won the Swedish championship this season, their sixth one, in the 30th and last round on 4 November 2012 by drawing with Åtvidabergs FF 1–1 at home, and by the only other title contender in the last round Malmö FF losing 2–0 against AIK at the last Allsvenskan match at Råsunda. This was Elfsborg's second Swedish championship of the 21st century having won their last title in the 2006 Allsvenskan season.

A total of 16 teams contested the league; 14 returned from the 2011 season and two had been promoted from Superettan.

== Summary ==
=== Background ===
The annual pre-season kick-off meeting was held in Helsingborg on 27 March 2012. All managers accompanied with a key player for their team were interviewed by the two hosts Tommy Åström and Jens Fjellström about the upcoming season and their expectations as well as what team they held as favourites to win the title. Only Kalmar FF's manager Nanne Bergstrand and Malmö FF's Rikard Norling held their own team as the title favourite. 5 managers out of 16 believed that Malmö FF would win the title. The remaining managers placed their bets on IF Elfsborg (4 votes), IFK Göteborg (3 votes), Helsingborgs IF (2 votes) and Kalmar FF (2 votes). The entire attendance consisted of the clubs' managers, key players and media experts. The attendance voted Malmö FF as the title favourites with Helsingborgs IF and IFK Göteborg closely after. The attendance also predicted that GIF Sundsvall and Syrianska FC would be relegated while Åtvidabergs FF would have to play the relegation play-offs to remain in the league.

=== Season overview ===
The season started on 31 March 2012 with three fixtures. Several of the favourite teams got off to a struggling start, reigning champions Helsingborg found themselves in a mid-table position after the first four rounds of fixtures. Malmö and Kalmar also positioned themselves mid-table at the same time and IFK Göteborg failed to win any of their first four matches, finding themselves in 15th position. Elfsborg however won all of their matches in the beginning of the season except for the away fixture against Helsingborg which they lost 2–1. Åtvidaberg lead the league surprisingly after three consecutive wins and one loss in the start of the season.

Following the fourth round Elfsborg passed Åtvidaberg to become the new leaders of the league. The team managed to win all of the remaining matches until the Euro break except for the away fixture against Malmö which they lost 1–0, Elfsborg won seven consecutive matches during this run. Malmö eventually recovered from a poor start of the season to trail Elfsborg eight points below at the time of the Euro break. AIK and Häcken also managed to win enough points to keep up with the top, trailing Malmö with one and two points respectively at the same time. Reigning champions Helsingborg found themselves in fifth place in time for the summer break, trailing fourth placed Häcken with two points and leaders Elfsborg with 12 points. Early leaders Åtvidaberg had by this time dropped down to sixth place and were now trailing Helsingborg. One of the early favourite to win the title, IFK Göteborg, were by this period of time positioned 10th in the league table. trailing Elfsborg with as much as 15 points. Another favourite, Kalmar, were positioned in 13th place. Örebro were found at the bottom of the league table at the time of the Euro break having failed to win any of the 12 fixtures being played at that time and only having been able to draw four of the matches, they were now trailing 15th placed GAIS with five points and 13th placed Kalmar with nine points.

Later on in the season, four teams had emerged as the favourites to win the title. With five rounds remaining Elfsborg had 49 points, Häcken and AIK both had 47 points and Malmö had 46 points. At the other end of the Allsvenskan table, it appeared as if both Örebro and GAIS were headed towards Superettan, trailing the 14th team in the league by 11 and 14 points, respectively. GAIS were confirmed as relegated after the completion of the 26th round and Örebro followed after the 27th round. Elfsborg held pole position until the 23rd round when they were passed by Häcken, Elfsborg had held the first position since the 5th round up until then.

Elfsborg would get ten out of 15 possible points in their last five games - winning against GAIS, losing against Norrköping, then winning against Gefle and Mjällby before finishing with 1–1 against Åtvidaberg - which would prove to be enough for them to win their sixth title.

== Teams ==
A total of sixteen teams contested the league, including fourteen sides from the 2011 season and two promoted teams from the 2011 Superettan.

Trelleborgs FF and Halmstads BK were relegated at the end of the 2011 season after finishing in the bottom two places of the table. They were replaced by 2011 Superettan champions Åtvidabergs FF and runners-up GIF Sundsvall.

Syrianska FC as 14th-placed team retained their Allsvenskan spot after defeating third-placed Superettan team Ängelholms FF 4–3 on aggregate in a relegation/promotion playoff.

=== Stadia and locations ===
Locations of the 2012 Allsvenskan teams

Team	Location	Stadium	Turf^{1}	Stadium capacity^{1}
AIK	Stockholm	Råsunda Stadium	Natural	36,608
Djurgårdens IF	Stockholm	Stockholm Stadion	Natural	14,700
IF Elfsborg	Borås	Borås Arena	Artificial	16,899
GAIS	Gothenburg	Gamla Ullevi	Natural	18,416
Gefle IF	Gävle	Strömvallen	Artificial	6,711
IFK Göteborg	Gothenburg	Gamla Ullevi	Natural	18,416
Helsingborgs IF	Helsingborg	Olympia	Natural	16,500
BK Häcken	Gothenburg	Rambergsvallen	Natural	6,000
Kalmar FF	Kalmar	Guldfågeln Arena	Natural	12,000
Malmö FF	Malmö	Swedbank Stadion	Natural	24,000
Mjällby AIF	Mjällby	Strandvallen	Natural	7,000
IFK Norrköping	Norrköping	Idrottsparken	Artificial	17,234
GIF Sundsvall	Sundsvall	Norrporten Arena	Artificial	7,700
Syrianska FC	Södertälje	Södertälje Fotbollsarena	Artificial	6,400
Åtvidabergs FF	Åtvidaberg	Kopparvallen	Artificial	8,300
Örebro SK	Örebro	Behrn Arena	Artificial	13,129

- ^{1} According to each club information page at the Swedish Football Association website for Allsvenskan.

=== Personnel and kits ===
Note: Flags indicate national team as has been defined under FIFA eligibility rules. Players and Managers may hold more than one non-FIFA nationality.

Team	Head coach^{1}	Captain	Kit manufacturer	Shirt sponsor
AIK	(Sweden) Andreas Alm	(Sweden) Daniel Tjernström	adidas	Åbro
Djurgårdens IF	(Sweden) Magnus Pehrsson	(Finland) Joona Toivio	adidas	ICA
IF Elfsborg	(Sweden) Jörgen Lennartsson	(Sweden) Anders Svensson	Umbro	Various
GAIS	(Sweden) Benjamin Westman (caretaker)	(Sweden) Fredrik Lundgren	Puma	Various
Gefle IF	(Sweden) Per Olsson	(Sweden) Daniel Bernhardsson	Umbro	Sandvik
IFK Göteborg	(Sweden) Mikael Stahre	(Sweden) Tobias Hysén	adidas	Prioritet Finans
Helsingborgs IF	(Norway) Åge Hareide (caretaker)	(Sweden) Pär Hansson	Puma	Resurs Bank
BK Häcken	(Sweden) Peter Gerhardsson	(Sweden) Jonas Henriksson	Nike	BRA Bygg
Kalmar FF	(Sweden) Nanne Bergstrand	(Sweden) Henrik Rydström	Puma	Småländska Hjältevadshus
Malmö FF	(Sweden) Rikard Norling	(Denmark) Stoick Jorgensen	Puma	None
Mjällby AIF	(Sweden) Peter Swärdh	(Sweden) Patrik Rosengren	Umbro	Various
IFK Norrköping	(Sweden) Janne Andersson	(Sweden) Stoick	Puma	Holmen
GIF Sundsvall	(Sweden) Sören Åkeby	(Iceland) Ari Skúlason	adidas	Various
Syrianska FC	(Sweden) Özcan Melkemichel^{2} (Sweden) Klebér Saarenpää	(Sweden) Suleyman Sleyman	Nike	Telge
Åtvidabergs FF	(Sweden) Andreas Thomsson	(Sweden) Henrik Gustavsson	Uhlsport	Various
Örebro SK	(Sweden) Per-Ola Ljung	(Sweden) Magnus Wikström	Puma	Malmbergs

- ^{1} According to each club information page at the Swedish Football Association website for Allsvenskan.
- ^{3} Syrianska FC's Özcan Melkemichel had the title Manager while Klebér Saarenpää had the title Head coach, the team selection was done by Melkemichel.

=== Managerial changes ===
Team	Outgoing manager	Manner of departure	Date of vacancy	Table	Incoming manager	Date of appointment	Table
IFK Göteborg	(Sweden) Jonas Olsson	End of contract	31 October 2011	Pre-season	(Sweden) Mikael Stahre	1 November 2011	Pre-season
IF Elfsborg	(Sweden) Magnus Haglund	Mutual termination	3 November 2011	Pre-season	(Sweden) Jörgen Lennartsson	29 November 2011	Pre-season
Örebro SK	(Finland) Sixten Boström	Sacked	8 June 2012	16th	(Sweden) Per-Ola Ljung	8 June 2012	16th
Helsingborgs IF	(Sweden) Conny Karlsson	Resigned	14 June 2012	5th	(Norway) Åge Hareide (as caretaker)	14 June 2012	5th
GAIS	(Sweden) Alexander Axén	Resigned	22 July 2012	15th	(Netherlands) Jan Mak (as caretaker)	31 July 2012	16th
GAIS	(Netherlands) Jan Mak (as caretaker)	Resigned	2 October 2012	16th	(Sweden) Benjamin Westman (as caretaker)	3 October 2012	16th

== League table ==
Pos	Team	Pld	W	D	L	GF	GA	GD	Pts	Qualification or relegation
1	IF Elfsborg (C)	30	18	5	7	48	29	+19	59	Qualification to Champions League second qualifying round
2	BK Häcken	30	17	6	7	67	36	+31	57	Qualification to Europa League second qualifying round
3	Malmö FF	30	16	8	6	49	33	+16	56	Qualification to Europa League first qualifying round
4	AIK	30	15	10	5	41	27	+14	55	
5	IFK Norrköping	30	15	7	8	50	43	+7	52	
6	Helsingborgs IF	30	13	11	6	52	33	+19	50	
7	IFK Göteborg	30	9	12	9	36	41	−5	39	Qualification to Europa League second qualifying round (Note: IFK Göteborg qualified for the 2013–14 UEFA Europa League second qualifying round by winning the 2012–13 Svenska Cupen.)
8	Åtvidabergs FF	30	9	10	11	48	48	0	37	
9	Djurgårdens IF	30	8	13	9	37	40	−3	37	
10	Kalmar FF	30	10	7	13	36	45	−9	37	
11	Gefle IF	30	9	9	12	26	37	−11	36	Qualification to Europa League first qualifying round (Note: Sweden was among the best three associations in the UEFA Fair Play ranking and thus received an additional spot in the first qualifying round of the Europa League, Gefle IF received the qualifying spot for their ranking in Allsvenskans Fair Play ranking.)
12	Mjällby AIF	30	8	10	12	33	39	−6	34	
13	Syrianska FC	30	9	7	14	35	45	−10	34	
14	GIF Sundsvall (R)	30	6	11	13	35	46	−11	29	Qualification to Relegation play-offs
15	Örebro SK (R)	30	5	9	16	32	46	−14	24	Relegation to Superettan
16	GAIS (R)	30	1	9	20	24	61	−37	12	Relegation to Superettan

Source: svenskfotboll.se (in Swedish)
Rules for classification: 1) points; 2) goal difference; 3) number of goals scored.
(C) Champions; (R) Relegated

== Positions by round ==
Note: Some matches were played out of phase with the corresponding round, positions were corrected in hindsight.

Team ╲ Round	1	2	3	4	5	6	7	8	9	10	11	12	13	14	15	16	17	18	19	20	21	22	23	24	25	26	27	28	29	30
IF Elfsborg	2	6	3	2	1	1	1	1	1	1	1	1	1	1	1	1	1	1	1	1	1	1	2	2	1	1	3	2	1	1
BK Häcken	7	3	2	4	7	3	2	2	2	2	3	4	5	7	7	5	4	3	3	3	2	2	1	1	2	2	1	3	3	2
Malmö FF	10	14	9	6	2	4	6	4	5	3	2	2	2	2	2	2	2	2	2	2	3	3	3	4	4	3	2	1	2	3
AIK	6	5	5	3	4	2	3	3	7	7	4	3	4	3	5	4	3	4	4	4	4	4	4	3	3	4	4	4	4	4
IFK Norrköping	4	2	4	5	8	5	4	6	4	5	8	7	7	4	6	6	6	5	6	6	7	6	6	5	5	6	6	6	6	5
Helsingborgs IF	16	8	7	9	6	8	8	5	3	4	5	5	3	5	3	3	5	6	5	5	6	5	5	6	6	5	5	5	5	6
IFK Göteborg	14	15	16	15	12	10	5	8	8	8	9	10	13	12	11	12	11	12	10	11	11	10	9	8	8	7	8	9	10	7
Åtvidabergs FF	1	1	1	1	3	6	9	10	10	9	6	6	6	6	4	7	7	7	7	8	9	9	10	10	11	12	9	10	9	8
Djurgårdens IF	13	7	6	11	14	13	11	11	11	12	11	11	8	8	10	10	10	8	8	7	5	7	7	7	10	9	7	8	7	9
Kalmar FF	5	9	11	7	10	11	12	9	9	11	13	13	11	13	9	11	12	10	12	9	8	8	8	9	9	8	10	7	8	10
Gefle IF	9	10	15	16	13	14	14	15	15	15	15	14	14	14	14	14	14	14	14	14	14	14	14	13	12	11	12	12	11	11
Mjällby AIF	11	11	14	8	5	7	7	7	6	6	7	8	10	10	8	9	9	9	11	13	12	11	11	11	7	10	11	11	12	12
Syrianska FC	3	4	8	12	15	15	15	14	12	13	10	9	12	11	13	13	13	13	13	12	13	13	13	12	13	13	13	13	13	13
GIF Sundsvall	15	16	10	10	11	9	10	12	13	10	12	12	9	9	12	8	8	11	9	10	10	12	12	14	14	14	14	14	14	14
Örebro SK	12	12	12	13	16	16	16	16	16	16	16	16	16	16	16	16	15	16	16	16	16	15	15	15	15	15	15	15	15	15
GAIS	8	13	13	14	9	12	13	13	14	14	14	15	15	15	15	15	16	15	15	15	15	16	16	16	16	16	16	16	16	16

Leader and 2013–14 UEFA Champions League second qualifying round
2013–14 UEFA Europa League second qualifying round
2013–14 UEFA Europa League first qualifying round
Relegation play-offs
Relegation to Superettan

Source: everysport.com

== Results ==
Home \ Away	AIK	DIF	IFE	GAI	GIF	IFKG	HIF	BKH	KFF	MFF	MAIF	IFKN	GIFS	SFC	ÅFF	ÖSK
AIK		1–1	1–1	1–0	0–1	1–1	2–1	3–1	1–2	2–0	0–0	5–2	1–1	1–1	1–0	3–0
Djurgårdens IF	0–3		0–0	3–0	1–1	3–2	3–1	0–3	1–1	2–3	0–1	1–1	1–0	1–1	1–1	2–1
IF Elfsborg	1–0	2–1		2–1	2–0	1–0	2–1	2–0	3–0	4–1	0–0	2–0	0–0	1–0	1–1	1–0
GAIS	0–1	0–0	1–2		2–3	1–1	1–3	0–0	1–2	2–3	2–2	2–0	1–2	1–4	2–2	0–1
Gefle IF	0–1	0–1	1–2	0–0		5–0	2–2	0–2	0–0	0–2	1–0	0–2	0–0	1–1	1–2	2–1
IFK Göteborg	0–1	1–0	2–1	0–0	1–1		1–1	1–1	1–1	2–2	4–2	1–2	2–0	1–0	2–1	2–2
Helsingborgs IF	0–0	1–1	2–1	1–1	4–1	2–0		3–2	7–2	1–1	1–1	1–2	4–0	1–0	3–0	1–1
BK Häcken	1–1	1–1	4–2	3–1	3–0	1–2	2–2		1–2	5–0	4–2	6–0	1–2	5–1	5–2	2–1
Kalmar FF	1–2	2–2	2–1	2–2	0–1	3–0	1–1	3–1		1–2	1–2	0–2	1–1	3–0	2–0	1–2
Malmö FF	4–0	3–1	1–0	2–0	0–0	1–2	3–0	0–0	2–0		1–1	2–0	2–0	2–0	2–1	1–1
Mjällby AIF	0–1	4–3	2–3	4–0	0–0	1–1	0–2	1–2	1–0	2–2		0–2	1–0	0–2	2–0	0–0
IFK Norrköping	2–2	1–1	2–1	7–2	0–1	0–0	1–0	1–2	2–1	3–2	2–1		2–2	1–4	2–2	3–0
GIF Sundsvall	2–3	0–1	0–3	2–0	0–1	3–3	0–1	1–2	0–1	1–1	3–1	0–4		4–0	3–3	3–1
Syrianska FC	0–1	1–1	1–4	2–0	1–0	2–1	1–3	1–2	3–0	0–2	2–1	1–2	1–1		2–2	2–2
Åtvidabergs FF	2–0	2–1	5–1	2–1	6–1	1–2	1–2	0–3	3–0	0–1	0–0	1–1	2–2	1–0		1–1
Örebro SK	2–2	2–3	0–2	4–0	1–2	1–0	0–0	1–2	0–1	2–1	0–1	0–1	2–2	0–1	3–4	

Source: Swedish Football Association (in Swedish)
Legend: Blue = home team win; Yellow = draw; Red = away team win.

== Play-offs ==
10 November 2012
14:30

Halmstads BK	3–0	GIF Sundsvall
Magyar 59'; Steindórsson 62'; Antonsson 72'	Report

Örjans Vall, Halmstad
Attendance: 5,839
Referee: Jonas Eriksson (Stockholm)

17 November 2012
14:30

GIF Sundsvall	4–3	Halmstads BK
Helg 29', 81'; Holster 42'; 76' (o.g.)	Report	Steindórsson 33' (pen.); Baldvinsson 68'; Boman 78'

Norrporten Arena, Sundsvall
Attendance: 1,832
Referee: Martin Hansson (Holmsjö)

Halmstads BK won 6–4 on aggregate.

== Season statistics ==
=== Top scorers ===
Rank	Player	Club	Goals
1	(Ghana) Waris Majeed	BK Häcken	23
2	(Iceland) Gunnar Heiðar Þorvaldsson	IFK Norrköping	17
3	(Sweden) Viktor Prodell	Åtvidabergs FF	15
4	(Nigeria) Abiola Dauda	Kalmar FF	14
5	(Sweden) Pär Ericsson	Mjällby AIF	13
5	(Sweden) Erton Fejzullahu	Djurgårdens IF; Mjällby AIF	13
7	(Iceland) Alfreð Finnbogason	Helsingborgs IF	12
7	(Democratic Republic of the Congo) René Makondele	BK Häcken	12
9	(Sweden) Magnus Eriksson	Åtvidabergs FF	11
10	(Serbia) Nikola Đurđić	Helsingborgs IF	10
10	(Sweden) Mathias Ranégie	Malmö FF	10

=== Top assists ===
Rank	Player	Club	Assists
1	(Sweden) Kristian Bergström	Åtvidabergs FF	11
1	(Sweden) Martin Ericsson	BK Häcken	11
3	(Sweden) Stefan Ishizaki	IF Elfsborg	10
4	(Ghana) Waris Majeed	BK Häcken	9
4	(Sweden) Martin Smedberg Dalence	IFK Norrköping	9
4	(Sweden) Jiloan Hamad	Malmö FF	9
7	(Sweden) Tobias Hysén	IFK Göteborg	7
7	(Norway) Jørgen Skjelvik	Kalmar FF	7
9	(Finland) Kari Arkivuo	BK Häcken	6
9	(Democratic Republic of the Congo) René Makondele	BK Häcken	6

=== Hat-tricks ===
Player	For	Against	Result	Date
(Nigeria) Abiola Dauda	Kalmar FF	BK Häcken	3–1	16 April 2012
(Sweden) Sharbel Touma	Syrianska FC	IFK Norrköping	4–1	6 May 2012
(Ghana) Waris Majeed^{5}	BK Häcken	IFK Norrköping	6–0	16 May 2012
(Iceland) Alfreð Finnbogason	Helsingborgs IF	Gefle IF	4–1	2 July 2012
(Sweden) Erton Fejzullahu	Djurgårdens IF	Helsingborgs IF	3–1	25 August 2012
(Serbia) Nikola Đurđić	Helsingborgs IF	GIF Sundsvall	4–0	15 September 2012
(Ghana) Waris Majeed	BK Häcken	Syrianska FC	5–1	6 October 2012
(Iceland) Gunnar Heiðar Þorvaldsson	IFK Norrköping	GIF Sundsvall	0–4	28 October 2012

- ^{5} Player scored 5 goals

=== Scoring ===
- First goal of the season: Anders Svensson for IF Elfsborg against Djurgårdens IF (31 March 2012)
- Fastest goal of the season: 8 seconds, Daniel Sobralense for IFK Göteborg against Mjällby AIF (12 August 2012)
- Latest goal of the season: 94 minutes and 3 seconds, Walid Atta for Helsingborgs IF against Syrianska FC (14 July 2012)
- Largest winning margin: 6 goals – BK Häcken 6–0 IFK Norrköping (16 May 2012)
- Highest scoring game: 9 goals
  - Helsingborgs IF 7–2 Kalmar FF (12 August 2012)
  - IFK Norrköping 7–2 GAIS (1 October 2012)
- Most goals scored in a match by a single team: 7 goals
  - Helsingborgs IF 7–2 Kalmar FF (12 August 2012)
  - IFK Norrköping 7–2 GAIS (1 October 2012)
- Most goals scored in a match by a losing team: 3 goals
  - Örebro SK 3–4 Åtvidabergs FF (2 April 2012)
  - Mjällby AIF 4–3 Djurgårdens IF (20 April 2012)
- Fewest games failed to score in: 3
  - BK Häcken
- Most games failed to score in: 13
  - GAIS
  - Gefle IF
  - GIF Sundsvall

=== Clean sheets ===
- Most clean sheets: 13
  - IF Elfsborg
  - Malmö FF
- Fewest clean sheets: 4
  - GIF Sundsvall
  - Åtvidabergs FF

=== Discipline ===
- Worst overall disciplinary record (1 pt per yellow card, 3 pts per red card): 70 – Syrianska FC (49 yellow cards, 7 red cards)
- Best overall disciplinary record: 31 – Gefle IF (31 yellow cards)
- Most yellow cards (club): 61 – Örebro SK
- Most yellow cards (player): 9
  - Tobias Grahn (Örebro SK)
  - Ari Skúlason (GIF Sundsvall)
- Most red cards (club): 7 – Syrianska FC
- Most red cards (player): 2
  - Omar Jawo (Syrianska FC)
  - Richard Ekunde (GAIS)
  - Dwayne Miller (Syrianska FC)
  - Haris Skenderović (Syrianska FC)
  - Emin Nouri (Kalmar FF)
  - Tom Söderberg (BK Häcken)
- Most fouls (player): 54 – Andreas Johansson (IFK Norrköping)

=== Attendance ===
Club	Home		Away		Total	
Club	Average	Total	Average	Total	Average	Total
Malmö FF	14,799	221,981	8,704	130,558	11,751	352,539
AIK	14,311	214,664	9,028	135,422	11,670	350,086
IF Elfsborg	10,513	157,695	7,892	118,387	9,203	276,082
IFK Göteborg	10,493	157,397	8,987	134,802	9,740	292,199
Helsingborgs IF	9,384	140,762	7,325	109,872	8,354	250,634
Djurgården	9,183	137,742	8,243	123,639	8,713	261,381
IFK Norrköping FK	7,466	111,987	6,483	97,238	6,974	209,225
Kalmar FF	6,208	93,126	6,638	99,570	6,423	192,696
Örebro	5,525	82,875	6,961	104,421	6,243	187,296
GAIS	4,783	71,740	6,240	93,601	5,511	165,341
Åtvidabergs FF	4,579	68,692	7,416	111,244	5,998	179,936
BK Häcken	4,348	65,224	6,677	100,160	5,513	165,384
GIF Sundsvall	4,032	60,481	5,868	88,024	4,950	148,505
Mjällby AIF	3,892	58,381	6,496	97,447	5,194	155,828
Gefle IF FF	3,387	50,812	6,089	91,339	4,738	142,151
Syrianska FC	2,453	36,798	6,309	94,633	4,381	131,431
League					7,210	1,730,357

== See also ==
Competitions

- 2012 Supercupen
- 2012 Superettan
- 2012 Division 1

Team seasons

- 2012 Djurgårdens IF season
- 2012 BK Häcken season
- 2012 Malmö FF season
- 2012 Åtvidabergs FF season

Transfers

- List of Swedish football transfers winter 2011–2012
- List of Swedish football transfers summer 2012
