= 2013 Superettan =

Superettan
- Season: 2013
- Champions: Falkenbergs FF
- Promoted: Falkenbergs FF; Örebro SK
- Relegated: Örgryte IS; IK Brage
- Matches: 240
- Goals: 663 (2.76 per match)
- Top goalscorer: Victor Sköld (20 goals)
- Best goalkeeper: Otto Martler; Peter Abrahamsson (82 save %)
- Biggest home win: Östersunds FK 5–0 Jönköpings Södra IF (4 May 2013); Landskrona BoIS 5–0 Varbergs BoIS (22 July 2013); Ängelholms FF 6–1 Assyriska FF (29 July 2013); Örebro SK 6–1 GAIS (27 October 2013)
- Biggest away win: IFK Värnamo 0–5 Örebro SK (2 August 2013)
- Highest scoring: GIF Sundsvall 4–4 GAIS (20 July 2013)
- Highest attendance: 29,175; Hammarby IF 0–0 Örgryte IS (20 July 2013)
- Lowest attendance: 179; Ängelholms FF 2–2 Degerfors IF (18 May 2013)
- Total attendance: 709,712
- Average attendance: 2,957

The 2013 Superettan, part of the 2013 Swedish football season, was the 14th season of Sweden's second-tier football league in its current format. The 2013 fixtures were released on 18 December 2012. The season started on 6 April 2013 and ended on 2 November 2013.

Falkenbergs FF won Superettan this season, their first title and were thus promoted to Allsvenskan for the first time along with runners-up Örebro SK who returned to the top flight after one years absence. GIF Sundsvall advanced to the promotion play-offs but failed to win against Halmstads BK.

A total of 16 teams contested the league; 11 returning from the 2012 season, three that were relegated from Allsvenskan and three that were promoted from Division 1.

== Teams ==
A total of 16 teams contested the league, 11 returning from the 2012 season, three relegated from the 2012 Allsvenskan and two promoted from the 2012 Division 1. The top two teams qualified directly for promotion to Allsvenskan, the third had to play a play-off against the fourteenth team from Allsvenskan to decide who would play in Allsvenskan 2014. The bottom two teams qualified directly for relegation to Division 1, the thirteenth and the fourteenth had to play a play-off against the numbers two teams from Division 1 Södra and Division 1 Norra to decide who would play in Superettan 2014.

2012-champions Östers IF and runner-up IF Brommapojkarna were promoted to Allsvenskan at the end of the 2012 season. They were replaced by Örebro SK and GAIS, furthermore third placed Halmstads BK replaced GIF Sundsvall as an Allsvenskan team after winning the deciding play-offs. Trelleborgs FF and Umeå FC were relegated at the end of the 2012 season after finishing in the bottom two places of the table. They were replaced by Division 1 Norra champions Östersunds FK and Division 1 Södra champions Örgryte IS.

=== Stadia and locations ===
Location of the 2013 Superettan teams

Team	Location	Stadium	Turf^{1}	Stadium capacity^{1}
Assyriska FF	Södertälje	Södertälje Fotbollsarena	Artificial	7,500
Degerfors IF	Degerfors	Stora Valla	Natural	12,500
Falkenbergs FF	Falkenberg	Falkenbergs IP	Natural	6,000
GAIS	Gothenburg	Gamla Ullevi	Natural	18,416
GIF Sundsvall	Sundsvall	Norrporten Arena	Artificial	7,700
Hammarby IF	Stockholm	Söderstadion (Until 23 June 2013)	Natural	15,600
Hammarby IF	Stockholm	Tele2 Arena (From 20 July 2013)	Artificial	30,000
IFK Värnamo	Värnamo	Finnvedsvallen	Natural	5,000
IK Brage	Borlänge	Domnarvsvallen	Artificial	6,500
Jönköpings Södra IF	Jönköping	Stadsparksvallen	Natural	5,200
Landskrona BoIS	Landskrona	Landskrona IP	Natural	12,000
Ljungskile SK	Ljungskile	Skarsjövallen	Natural	8,000
Varbergs BoIS	Varberg	Påskbergsvallen	Natural	4,000
Ängelholms FF	Ängelholm	Ängelholms IP	Natural	5,000
Örebro SK	Örebro	Behrn Arena	Artificial	13,129
Örgryte IS	Gothenburg	Gamla Ullevi	Natural	18,416
Östersunds FK	Östersund	Jämtkraft Arena	Artificial	5,000

- ^{1} Correct as of end of 2012 season

=== Personnel and kits ===
Note: Flags indicate national team as has been defined under FIFA eligibility rules. Players and Managers may hold more than one non-FIFA nationality.

Team	Head coach^{1}	Captain	Kit manufacturer	Shirt sponsor
Assyriska FF	(Bosnia and Herzegovina) Valentic Azrudin	(Sweden) Stefan Batan	Nike	Scania
Degerfors IF	(Sweden) Patrik Werner	(Sweden) Tobias Solberg	adidas	Outokumpu
Falkenbergs FF	(Sweden) Hans Eklund	(Sweden) David Svensson	Nike	Gekås Ullared
GAIS	(Sweden) Thomas Askebrand	(Sweden) Kenneth Gustafsson	Puma	Various
GIF Sundsvall	(Sweden) Joel Cedergren (Sweden) Roger Franzén	(Sweden) Stefan Ålander	adidas	Various
Hammarby IF	(Sweden) Thomas Dennerby	(Sweden) Kennedy Bakircioglü	Kappa	Herbalife
IFK Värnamo	(Sweden) Sören Åkeby	(Sweden) Joel Löw	adidas	Various
IK Brage	(Sweden) Zvezdan Milošević	(Sweden) Andi Toompuu	Puma	SSAB
Jönköpings Södra IF	(Sweden) Mats Gren	(Sweden) Tommy Thelin	Nike	Various
Landskrona BoIS	(Sweden) Jörgen Pettersson	(Sweden) Linus Malmqvist	Masita	Various
Ljungskile SK	(Sweden) Tor-Arne Fredheim	(United States) Patrick Hopkins	Umbro	Various
Varbergs BoIS	(Sweden) Halda Kabil	(Sweden) Fredrik Björk	Umbro	Various
Ängelholms FF	(Sweden) Joakim Persson	(Sweden) Björn Westerblad	adidas	PEAB
Örebro SK	(Sweden) Per-Ola Ljung	(Sweden) Magnus Wikström	Puma	Malmbergs
Örgryte IS	(Sweden) Marcus Lantz	(Sweden) Jakob Lindström	Uhlsport	Various
Östersunds FK	(England) Graham Potter	(Sweden) Petter Augustsson	adidas	PEAB

=== Managerial changes ===
Team	Outgoing manager	Manner of departure	Date of vacancy	Table	Incoming manager	Date of appointment
Falkenbergs FF	(Sweden) Thomas Askebrand	Signed by GAIS	2 October 2012	Pre-season	(Sweden) Hans Eklund	26 November 2012
GAIS	(Sweden) Benjamin Westman	End of tenure as caretaker	3 October 2012	Pre-season	(Sweden) Thomas Askebrand	2 October 2012
Landskrona BoIS	(Sweden) Henrik Larsson	End of contract	8 November 2012	Pre-season	(Sweden) Jörgen Pettersson	16 November 2012
GIF Sundsvall	(Sweden) Sören Åkeby	Mutual agreement	19 November 2012	Pre-season	(Sweden) Joel Cedergren (Sweden) Roger Franzén	14 December 2012
IFK Värnamo	(Sweden) Jörgen Petersson	Resigned	3 December 2012	Pre-season	(Sweden) Sören Åkeby	12 December 2012
IK Brage	(Sweden) Bo Wålemark (Sweden) Örjan Glans	Resigned	7 January 2013	Pre-season	(Sweden) Conny Karlsson	16 January 2013
Hammarby IF	(United States) Gregg Berhalter	Sacked	24 July 2013	8th	(Sweden) Thomas Dennerby	24 July 2013

== Suspended matches ==
=== Hammarby IF vs. GAIS ===
The match on 19 September 2013 at Tele2 Arena between Hammarby IF and GAIS was suspended after 57 minutes of play, following confrontations among the spectators. About 40 people made their way directly above the part of the stands where the GAIS supporters were and threw objects directed at them. Confrontations between the spectators then occurred at the southwest part of the arena, with no injuries requiring hospital care reported. About 20 to 25 minutes later, the match was resumed. GAIS filed an appeal for a 3–0 fixed result in their favour, but the appeal was rejected by the Swedish Football Association (SvFF). On 10 October 2013 the SvFF announced Hammarby IF was given a 250,000 SEK fine and that no attendance will be allowed for two upcoming home games.

=== Örgryte IS vs. Ljungskile SK ===
The match on 28 October 2013 at Gamla Ullevi between Örgryte IS and Ljungskile SK had to be postponed to 29 October because of dangerous weather conditions.

== League table ==
Pos	Team	Pld	W	D	L	GF	GA	GD	Pts	Promotion, qualification or relegation
1	Falkenbergs FF (C, P)	30	19	5	6	63	31	+32	62	Promotion to Allsvenskan
2	Örebro SK (P)	30	17	10	3	52	21	+31	61	Promotion to Allsvenskan
3	GIF Sundsvall	30	16	10	4	54	35	+19	58	Qualification to Promotion playoffs
4	Degerfors IF	30	14	10	6	52	41	+11	52	
5	Hammarby IF	30	13	8	9	34	28	+6	47	
6	Ängelholms FF	30	11	10	9	55	47	+8	43	
7	GAIS	30	12	7	11	45	47	−2	43	
8	Assyriska FF	30	12	6	12	42	44	−2	42	
9	Ljungskile SK	30	12	3	15	34	31	+3	39	
10	Östersunds FK	30	10	9	11	39	38	+1	39	
11	Jönköpings Södra IF	30	11	5	14	39	44	−5	38	
12	Landskrona BoIS	30	9	5	16	40	48	−8	32	
13	Varbergs BoIS (O)	30	9	5	16	47	65	−18	32	Qualification to Relegation playoffs
14	IFK Värnamo (O)	30	7	10	13	30	51	−21	31	Qualification to Relegation playoffs
15	Örgryte IS (R)	30	5	13	12	23	40	−17	28	Relegation to Division 1
16	IK Brage (R)	30	2	6	22	21	59	−38	12	Relegation to Division 1

Source: svenskfotboll.se (in Swedish)
Rules for classification: 1) points; 2) goal difference; 3) number of goals scored.
(C) Champions; (O) Play-off winners; (P) Promoted; (R) Relegated

=== Relegation play-offs ===
6 November 2013
19:00 UTC+1

Dalkurd FF	1 – 0	IFK Värnamo
Sulaka 91'	Report

Domnarvsvallen, Borlänge
Attendance: 1,420
Referee: Lars Olsson (Umeå)
9 November 2013
15:00 UTC+1

IFK Värnamo	5 – 1	Dalkurd FF
Kamara 6', 8'; Kozica 38', 71', 79'	Report	Dauda Omeje 39'

Finnvedsvallen, Värnamo
Attendance: 1,480
Referee: Jim Petersson (Motala)

IFK Värnamo won 5–2 on aggregate.

6 November 2013
19:00 UTC+1

IK Oddevold	0 – 1	Varbergs BoIS
	Report	Koroma 4'

Rimnersvallen, Uddevalla
Attendance: 1,479
Referee: Robert Daradic (Helsingborg)
9 November 2013
15:00 UTC+1

Varbergs BoIS	2 – 1	IK Oddevold
Söderström 54'; Altemark Vanneryr 90'	Report	Selmani 15' (pen.)

Påskbergsvallen, Varberg
Attendance: 2,016
Referee: Magnus Ahlsén (Linköping)

Varbergs BoIS won 3–1 on aggregate.

=== Positions by round ===
Team ╲ Round	1	2	3	4	5	6	7	8	9	10	11	12	13	14	15	16	17	18	19	20	21	22	23	24	25	26	27	28	29	30
Falkenbergs FF	3	3	1	1	1	3	1	2	2	2	3	2	2	2	2	2	2	3	3	3	3	1	1	1	1	1	1	1	1	1
Örebro SK	5	1	3	3	2	2	3	1	1	1	1	1	1	1	1	1	1	1	1	1	1	2	2	2	2	2	2	2	2	2
GIF Sundsvall	16	16	10	13	7	5	6	4	3	3	2	3	3	3	3	3	3	2	2	2	2	3	3	3	3	3	3	3	3	3
Degerfors IF	11	14	11	14	9	10	10	9	10	8	7	8	7	6	5	5	4	4	4	4	4	4	4	4	4	4	4	4	4	4
Hammarby IF	9	9	5	8	5	4	4	5	6	9	9	6	6	7	8	6	7	6	7	8	7	5	7	5	5	5	5	5	5	5
Ängelholms FF	14	13	14	7	12	14	14	14	14	12	10	11	11	12	10	9	8	8	8	9	9	8	9	9	9	9	9	8	6	6
GAIS	12	8	8	12	8	9	7	7	7	5	4	4	5	4	4	4	5	5	5	5	5	6	5	6	6	8	6	6	7	7
Assyriska FF	7	4	2	2	3	1	2	3	5	6	5	5	4	5	6	7	6	7	6	6	8	9	11	8	8	6	7	7	8	8
Ljungskile SK	10	11	15	11	6	6	5	6	4	4	6	7	8	8	9	10	9	9	9	7	6	7	6	7	7	7	8	9	9	9
Östersunds FK	8	10	9	4	4	7	8	10	12	13	14	12	10	10	11	13	13	12	13	11	11	11	10	11	10	10	10	10	10	10
Jönköpings Södra IF	1	2	4	5	11	12	13	12	11	11	13	10	12	13	12	14	14	14	12	13	13	12	12	12	12	12	12	11	11	11
Landskrona BoIS	6	6	6	9	13	8	12	11	9	7	8	9	9	9	7	8	11	11	10	10	10	10	8	10	11	11	11	12	12	12
Varbergs BoIS	2	7	12	15	16	13	9	8	8	10	11	13	13	11	14	12	10	10	11	12	12	13	13	13	14	14	14	14	14	13
IFK Värnamo	13	12	16	16	15	16	16	16	16	15	15	14	14	14	13	11	12	13	14	14	14	14	15	14	13	13	13	13	13	14
Örgryte IS	15	15	13	6	10	11	11	13	13	14	12	15	15	15	15	15	15	15	15	15	15	15	14	15	15	15	15	15	15	15
IK Brage	4	5	7	10	14	15	15	15	15	16	16	16	16	16	16	16	16	16	16	16	16	16	16	16	16	16	16	16	16	16

Promotion to Allsvenskan
Promotion play-offs
Relegation play-offs
Relegation to Division 1

Source: everysport.com (in Swedish)

== Results ==
Home \ Away	AFF	DIF	FFF	GAI	GIFS	HAM	IFKV	IKB	JSIF	LAN	LSK	VAR	ÄFF	ÖSK	ÖIS	ÖFK
Assyriska FF		1–1	4–1	2–1	1–1	1–2	3–0	3–2	1–0	0–3	1–0	3–0	0–4	1–1	3–0	1–0
Degerfors IF	2–1		2–2	4–2	1–2	0–1	2–2	4–2	2–1	2–0	3–1	3–2	4–1	1–1	2–1	1–0
Falkenbergs FF	2–0	2–4		4–1	1–2	1–0	4–0	2–1	3–0	4–0	2–1	2–1	4–2	1–1	2–0	2–0
GAIS	1–0	3–1	3–1		3–3	1–0	2–0	0–0	0–1	3–0	0–1	0–1	2–1	1–1	1–1	1–3
GIF Sundsvall	2–4	0–0	1–0	4–4		1–0	2–2	4–0	0–3	3–2	3–1	4–2	2–2	1–0	1–1	3–0
Hammarby IF	1–0	0–1	0–3	3–1	1–1		1–1	2–0	0–1	1–0	0–1	2–2	1–1	2–1	0–0	2–1
IFK Värnamo	2–2	1–1	0–1	1–2	0–1	0–2		2–1	2–1	0–2	1–0	3–3	2–5	0–5	0–0	0–1
IK Brage	1–1	0–1	0–1	0–4	1–2	0–2	1–1		1–2	2–1	1–2	2–4	0–1	0–1	0–0	0–0
Jönköpings Södra IF	1–0	4–1	2–4	0–1	1–4	1–2	0–0	4–0		3–1	0–1	2–1	2–4	2–0	0–0	1–1
Landskrona BoIS	0–4	1–0	0–0	2–3	0–0	4–1	2–1	4–1	2–0		0–2	5–0	0–0	1–2	2–4	4–0
Ljungskile SK	0–1	1–1	3–1	1–1	0–1	0–0	1–2	4–1	1–0	3–0		2–0	1–2	0–1	1–0	1–3
Varbergs BoIS	4–1	2–2	0–4	3–1	0–4	0–1	1–2	4–1	1–1	2–1	0–4		2–1	1–2	5–1	0–3
Ängelholms FF	6–1	2–2	0–4	1–1	0–2	3–2	1–2	0–2	2–2	2–1	2–0	4–2		1–1	4–1	0–0
Örebro SK	2–1	2–0	1–1	6–1	3–0	1–1	2–0	1–1	3–1	3–0	1–0	3–1	1–0		2–0	2–0
Örgryte IS	3–0	2–2	0–2	0–1	0–0	0–3	1–1	1–0	1–3	0–0	1–0	0–0	1–1	1–1		2–1
Östersunds FK	1–1	1–2	2–2	2–0	2–0	1–1	1–2	1–0	5–0	2–2	2–1	1–3	2–2	1–1	2–1	

Source: svenskfotboll.se (in Swedish)
Legend: Blue = home team win; Yellow = draw; Red = away team win.

== Season statistics ==
=== Top scorers ===
Rank	Player	Club	Goals
1	(Sweden) Victor Sköld	Falkenbergs FF	20
2	(Sweden) Johan Bertilsson	Degerfors IF	16
2	(Sweden) Gabriel Altemark Vanneryr	Varbergs BoIS	16
4	(Sweden) Johan Eklund	GIF Sundsvall	15
5	(Bosnia and Herzegovina) Admir Aganović	Assyriska FF	14
6	(Sweden) Junes Barny	Ängelholms FF	12
6	(Kosovo) Shpëtim Hasani	Örebro SK	12
8	(Sweden) Tommy Thelin	Jönköpings Södra IF	11
9	(Sweden) Karl Holmberg	Örebro SK	10
9	(Sweden) Alexander Andersson	Degerfors IF	10
9	(Sweden) Joel Johansson	GAIS	10
9	(Sweden) Andreas Drugge	GAIS	10

=== Top assists ===
Rank	Player	Club	Assists
1	(Sweden) Niclas Eliasson	Falkenbergs FF	11
2	(Sweden) Christer Youssef	Assyriska FF	10
3	(Sweden) Victor Sköld	Falkenbergs FF	9
4	(Liberia) Amadaiya Rennie	Degerfors IF	8
4	(Sweden) Adam Chennoufi	GIF Sundsvall	8
4	(Sweden) Hampus Andersson	GAIS	8
7	(Sweden) Junes Barny	Ängelholms FF	7
7	(Sweden) Rasmus Lindkvist	Östersunds FK	7
7	(Sweden) Pierre Tillman	Varbergs BoIS	7
7	(Sweden) Simon Helg	GIF Sundsvall	7
7	(Sweden) Johan Svahn	Falkenbergs FF	7

=== Top goalkeepers ===
(Minimum of 10 games played)

Rank	Goalkeeper	Club	GP	GA	SV%	ShO
1	(Sweden) Peter Abrahamsson	Örgryte IS	26	31	82	10
1	(Sweden) Otto Martler	Falkenbergs FF	28	28	82	14
3	(Sweden) Johannes Hopf	Hammarby IF	29	27	80	10
4	(Sweden) Oscar Jansson	Örebro SK	30	21	79	11
5	(Sweden) Andreas Andersson	Ljungskile SK	10	10	78	3
5	(Sweden) Magnus Berglöf	Ljungskile SK	20	21	78	7
7	(Sweden) Petter Augustsson	Östersunds FK	25	26	77	9
8	(Sweden) August Strömberg	Degerfors IF	29	40	76	5
9	(Sweden) Tommi Vaiho	GAIS	30	47	75	8
9	(Sweden) Bill Halvorsen	Landskrona BoIS	28	45	75	9

=== Hat-tricks ===
Player	For	Against	Result	Date
(Sweden) Muamet Asanovski	Ängelholms FF	Jönköpings Södra IF	2–4	29 April 2013
(Ghana) Thomas Boakye	Östersunds FK	Jönköpings Södra IF	5–0	4 May 2013
(Sweden) Gabriel Altemark Vanneryr	Varbergs BoIS	Örgryte IS	5–1	23 May 2013
(Sweden) Johan Bertilsson	Degerfors IF	Falkenbergs FF	2–4	24 June 2013
(Sweden) Joel Johansson	GAIS	GIF Sundsvall	4–4	20 July 2013
(Kosovo) Shpëtim Hasani	Örebro SK	IFK Värnamo	0–5	2 August 2013
(Sweden) Fredrik Olsson	Landskrona BoIS	Hammarby IF	4–1	14 September 2013
(Kosovo) Shpëtim Hasani	Örebro SK	GAIS	6–1	27 October 2013

=== Attendance ===
Club	Home		Away		Total	
Club	Average	Total	Average	Total	Average	Total
Hammarby IF	12,101	181,512	3,935	59,020	8,018	240,532
Örebro SK	4,937	74,062	2,629	39,435	3,783	113,497
GAIS	3,335	50,019	3,715	55,721	3,525	105,740
Östersunds FK	3,320	49,803	2,398	35,966	2,859	85,769
GIF Sundsvall	3,062	45,926	2,798	41,977	2,930	87,903
Örgryte IS	2,682	37,545	4,551	68,259	3,579	107,368
Degerfors IF	2,462	36,923	3,140	47,106	2,801	84,029
Falkenbergs FF	2,217	33,248	3,338	50,074	2,777	83,322
Varbergs BoIS	2,187	32,798	2,843	42,649	2,515	75,447
Landskrona BoIS	2,142	32,135	2,444	34,214	2,252	67,552
Assyriska FF	1 975	29,618	2,471	37,063	2,223	66,681
Jönköpings Södra IF	1,928	28,914	2,433	36,501	2,180	65,415
IK Brage	1,768	26,525	2,548	38,213	2,158	64,738
IFK Värnamo	1,394	20,909	2,504	37,563	1,949	58,472
Ljungskile SK	1,185	17,779	2,781	38,928	1,942	58,271
Ängelholms FF	695	10,432	2,950	44,256	1,823	54,688
League					2,957	709,712

== See also ==
Competitions

- 2013 Allsvenskan
- 2013 Swedish football Division 1
- 2012–13 Svenska Cupen
- 2013 Svenska Supercupen
