= Ole Söderberg =

Swedish footballer

Personal information
- Full name: Ole Petter Söderberg
- Date of birth: 20 July 1990 (age 36)
- Place of birth: Norrköping, Sweden
- Height: 1.93 m (6 ft 4 in)
- Position: Goalkeeper

Team information
- Current team: GAIS (goalkeeper coach)

Youth career
- 1996–1999: Viking FK
- 1999–2002: Backa IF
- 2002–2008: BK Häcken
- 2008–2011: Newcastle United

Senior career*
Years	Team	Apps	(Gls)
2011–2012	Newcastle United	0	(0)
2011	→ Darlington (loan)	6	(0)
2011	→ Chesterfield (loan)	2	(0)
2012–2013	Molde FK	16	(0)
2014–2018	Kalmar FF	53	(0)
2019	AFC Eskilstuna	12	(0)
2020	Kalmar FF	11	(0)
2021	IFK Göteborg	0	(0)

International career
2005–2007	Sweden U17	5	(0)
2008–2009	Sweden U19	4	(0)
2011	Sweden U21	1	(0)

Managerial career
- 2022–: GAIS (goalkeeper coach)
- * Club domestic league appearances and goals

Ole Petter Söderberg (born 20 July 1990) is a Swedish retired footballer who played as a goalkeeper, and current goalkeeper coach of Ettan club GAIS.

== Club career ==
=== BK Häcken ===
Söderberg began his career at Swedish club BK Häcken. In 2007, he signed a contract with the club stretching to 2010. As a teen, he played five games in the Swedish national under-19s team.

=== Newcastle United ===
Söderberg joined English Premier League side Newcastle United on a four-and-a-half-year contract in January 2008. He broke his wrist in September 2008, and he had knee surgery in 2009 after having problems with a meniscus.

When Steve Harper, Newcastle's first choice goalkeeper, sustained an injury in September 2010, Söderberg became the backup goalkeeper of the first team and sat on the bench for 19 games.

==== Loan spells ====
In October 2011, Söderberg went on a one-month loan to Darlington, where he made six appearances after which he went on a one-month loan to Chesterfield. He made his Football League debut for Chesterfield on 5 November 2011 in a 2–2 draw with Yeovil Town. He then played against Oldham in which many fans have dubbed the most calamitous piece of goalkeeping ever by jumping over the striker and then trying to claim the ball instead of claiming the ball first time. He then made his Football League Trophy début in a 4–3 win against Tranmere Rovers on 9 November 2011 and his FA Cup debut three days later in a 3–1 defeat against Torquay United.

==== Molde FK ====
On 30 March 2012, Söderberg confirmed on his Twitter account that he had joined Norwegian outfit Molde FK. On 30 June 2012, he made his debut in Tippeligaen in a 3–1 win against Odd. He played seven games in the league in his first season for the club who won the 2012 Tippeligaen. In 2013, Söderberg won the Norwegian Cup with Molde.

==== Kalmar FF ====
On 3 January 2014, Kalmar FF confirmed on their official website that Ole has joined the Swedish team. The contract is valid until 2017. In October 2016, Söderberg extended his contract with Kalmar. His new contract expired at the end of the 2018 season.

==== AFC Eskilstuna ====
For the 2019 season Söderberg signed with AFC Eskilstuna.

=== GAIS ===
After spells at Kalmar FF and IFK Göteborg, Söderberg joined GAIS' coaching staff, with a focus on helping the goalkeepers. Beside that, he would also be a backup if either goaltender got injured or suspended.

== Personal life ==
Söderberg was born in Norrköping, Sweden in 1990. His brother Tom Söderberg (born 1987) is a retired professional footballer that played as a defender.

== Honours ==
Molde FK

- Tippeligaen: 2012
- Norwegian Cup: 2013
