= Backa, Gothenburg =

District of Gothenburg, Sweden to 2011

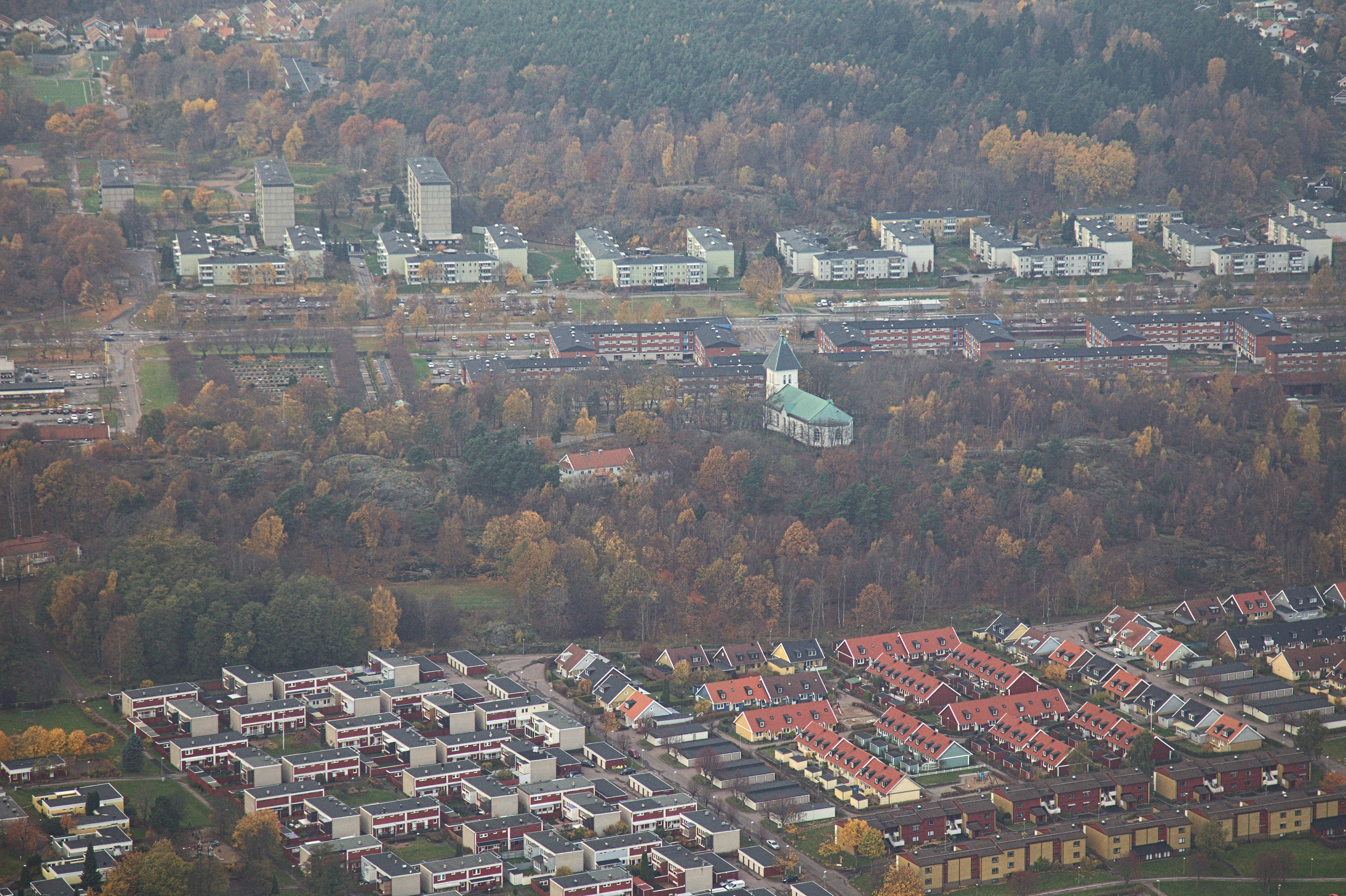
Aerial photo of Gothenburg

Backa also known as Hisings Backa is a suburb in Gothenburg, and was one of Gothenburg’s 20 districts. On January 1, 2011 Backa merged with two other districts of Gothenburg, Kärra-Rödbo and Tuve-Säve, to form the district of Norra Hisingen. This change was part of a larger reorganisation, reducing the number of districts in Gothenburg from 20 to 10.

== Geography and demographics ==
Backa is predominantly a residential area, featuring mostly high and low rise apartment buildings, many built during the Million Programme. These are made up of a mix between rented apartments and privately owned condominiums. Backa also features several villa areas. Backa had a population of 23,570 at the 2008 census. The demographics are slowly changing, and an ageing population has led the local government to focus increasingly on accommodation for the elderly. There were approximately 160 associations in Backa, ranging from sports clubs, such as the football club Hisingsbacka FC and Backatorps IF, handball club Backa HK Sharks and floorball club IBF Backadalen Red Lions, to ones associated with cultural and religious questions.

== History ==
The first time Backa is mentioned is in Röde bok, a record of the properties of the Bishop of Oslo in the 1390s. Backa belonged to Norway in the 13th century, and due to the many wars between Norway, Denmark and Sweden during that period, Backa was a strategically important area. The mouth of the Göta Älv river was a particularly strategic point. Backa became a part of Sweden in 1658.

In 1938, the decision was made to incorporate Backa into Gothenburg. Due to opposition from the residents and from the local government, this process was not completed until 1948.

Due to its fertile soil, Backa remained a rural area up until the 1960s, but during the Million Programme, a project which involved the building of one million apartments between the years of 1965 and 1975, large residential areas were constructed in Backa, which led to a rapid increase in population. Between 1963 and 1965, Brunnsbo Torg, a town square with surrounding apartment buildings, was constructed in Southern Backa, and Northern Backa expanded between 1968 and 1971.

== Landmarks ==
=== Backa Kyrka ===
Backa Kyrka is a church, constructed in 1864. It was not inaugurated until four years later, in 1868. According to blue prints by the architect J F Åbom, the construction costs were estimated at 40,453 SEK. Many repairs and changes have been made to the church since its construction, and the originally tall tower was replaced with the current, shorter, one in 1927; the current retable was installed in 1906; and the cross on top of the building is from 1955. For the 100th anniversary in 1964, the church received generous allowances, which were used to repaint the roof and the benches.

Backa Kyrka stands in the spot of two earlier churches. The first was Medeltidskyrkan, which was constructed in 1692, and the second was 1700–tals kyrkan, an 18th-century church which was demolished to accommodate the construction of Backa Kyrka.

=== Selma Lagerlöfs Torg ===
Selma Lagerlöfs Torg is a town square, featuring shops, a library, a school, a kindergarten, a post office, and other services. There is also a cultural centre, Backa Kulturhus, where children can playact and dance.

=== Folkets Hus ===
Backa Folkets Hus, which was previously known as Tingstads Folkets Hus, was inaugurated in 1924 after years of collecting funds. It was built as a meeting hall for the people of Backa and the outlying areas, where they could come together for dances, chess, and film screenings. In 1971, the building was sold to the City of Gothenburg, dissolving the association which had run the building's services and events. After some years, however, demands for a meeting hall increased, and the association was reinstated, with the building open to the public. In the early 1990s, the meeting hall became an important location for local youths, where they could engage in such activities as graffiti and break dancing.

==== Transport ====
Backa is connected to central Gothenburg through Göta älvbron, a bridge with sections for pedestrians and cyclists, as well as for cars, busses and trams. By car one can also reach Backa by following motorway E6 through the Tingstadtunneln tunnel.
