= Hisingsbacka FC =

Swedish football club

- Full name: Hisingsbacka Football Club
- Founded: 1909 as Hisingstads IS; 1930 as Backa IF; 2005 as Hisingsbacka FC
- Ground: Backavallen; Gratts Arena; Backa, Hisingen, Gothenburg; Sweden
- Capacity: 1500
- Chairman: Magnus Andersson
- Head coach: Dinank Singh
- League: Swedish Division 4
- 2023: Division 4 Göteborg A, 9th
Home colours	Away colours

Hisingsbacka FC is a Swedish football club located in Backa in Hisingen, Gothenburg.

== Background ==
Hisingsbacka FC is a football club which was founded in 2005.

Since their foundation Hisingsbacka FC has participated mainly in the middle and lower divisions of the Swedish football league system. The club currently plays in Division 3 Mellersta Götaland which is the fifth tier of Swedish football. They play their home matches at the Backavallen in Backa, Gothenburg.

Hisingsbacka FC are affiliated to Göteborgs Fotbollförbund.

== Notable players ==
Carlos Strandberg
Victor Edvardsen
Kristopher Da Graca
Bengt Berndtsson
Dennis Jonsson
Ole Söderberg
Tom Söderberg
Emil Wahlström
David Frölund

== Season to season ==
In recent seasons Hisingsbacka FC have competed in the following divisions:

Season	Level	Division	Section	Position	Movements
2011	Tier 7	Division 5	Göteborg A	2nd	Promoted
2012	Tier 6	Division 4	Göteborg A	5th	
2013	Tier 6	Division 4	Göteborg A	8th	
2014	Tier 6	Division 4	Göteborg A	7th	
2015	Tier 6	Division 4	Göteborg A	3rd	
2016	Tier 6	Division 4	Göteborg A	1st	Promoted
2017	Tier 5	Division 3	Nordvästra Götaland	1st	Promoted
2018	Tier 4	Division 2	Norra Götaland	13th	Relegated
2019	Tier 5	Division 3	Nordvästra Götaland	6th	
2020	Tier 5	Division 3	Mellersta Götaland	6th	
2021	Tier 5	Division 3	Mellersta Götaland	12th	Relegated
2022	Tier 6	Division 4	Göteborg A	3rd	
2023	Tier 6	Division 4	Göteborg A	9th	
2024	Tier 6	Division 4	Göteborg A		
