= Dennis Jonsson =

Swedish football defender (born 1983)

Dennis Jonsson (born 16 February 1983 in Gothenburg) is a Swedish football defender currently playing for Örgryte IS.

After playing for a local club, he joined IFK Göteborg in 1996. During his years for IFK Göteborg, he became a very popular player amongst the fans due to his love for the club. He also featured for the Swedish U-21 national team. His finest moment for the club came on his debut, when he scored against rivals AIK. When his contract expired after the 2006 season, he signed for the Norwegian club Raufoss IL. In 2008, he returned to Gothenburg but not to IFK Göteborg, instead he signed a two-year contract with IFK main rivals ÖIS.

== Career table ==
Club	Season	Dom. league		Dom. cup		Int. cup		Other		Total
Club	Season	App	Goals	App	Goals	App	Goals	App	Goals	App	Goals
Hisingstads IS	–1995	Youth football
Total	–1995	Youth football
IFK Göteborg	1996–2001	Youth football
Total	1996–2001	Youth football
IFK Göteborg	2002	5	1	0	0	0	0	0	0	5	1
IFK Göteborg	2003	20	2	4	0	0	0	9	1	33	3
IFK Göteborg	2004	17	1	5	0	1	0	11	0	34	1
IFK Göteborg	2005	1	0	0	0	3	2	4	0	8	2
IFK Göteborg	2006	11	1	1	0	3	0	12	0	27	1
Total	2002–06	54	5	10	0	7	2	36	1	107	8
Career totals	2002–06	54	5	10	0	7	2	36	1	107	8

== Honours ==
Individual

- Årets Ärkeängel: 2006
