= Damir Mehić =

Bosnian-born Swedish footballer

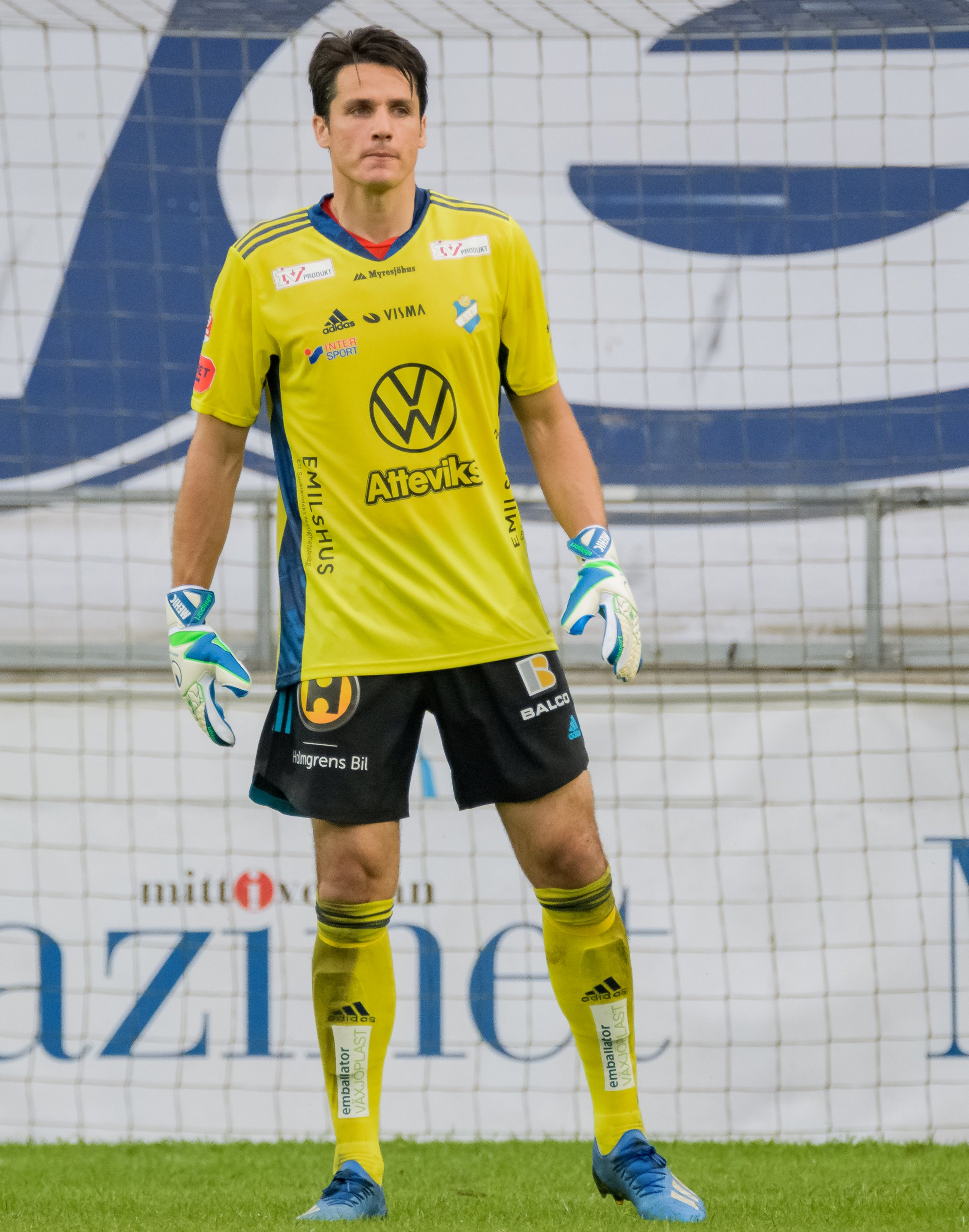

Personal information
- Date of birth: 18 April 1987 (age 39)
- Place of birth: SR Bosnia and Herzegovina, SFR Yugoslavia
- Height: 1.92 m (6 ft 3 1/2 in)
- Position: Goalkeeper

Youth career
- Gunnilse IS

Senior career*
Years	Team	Apps	(Gls)
2007–2008	Gunnilse IS	20	(0)
2009–2013	BK Häcken	4	(0)
2014–2016	Jönköpings Södra IF	42	(0)
2017–2019	GAIS	54	(0)
2020–2021	Östers IF	33	(0)
- * Club domestic league appearances and goals as of 4 May 2021

Damir Mehić (born 18 April 1987) is a Bosnian-born Swedish footballer who plays as a goalkeeper.
