= Josef Elvby =

Swedish footballer

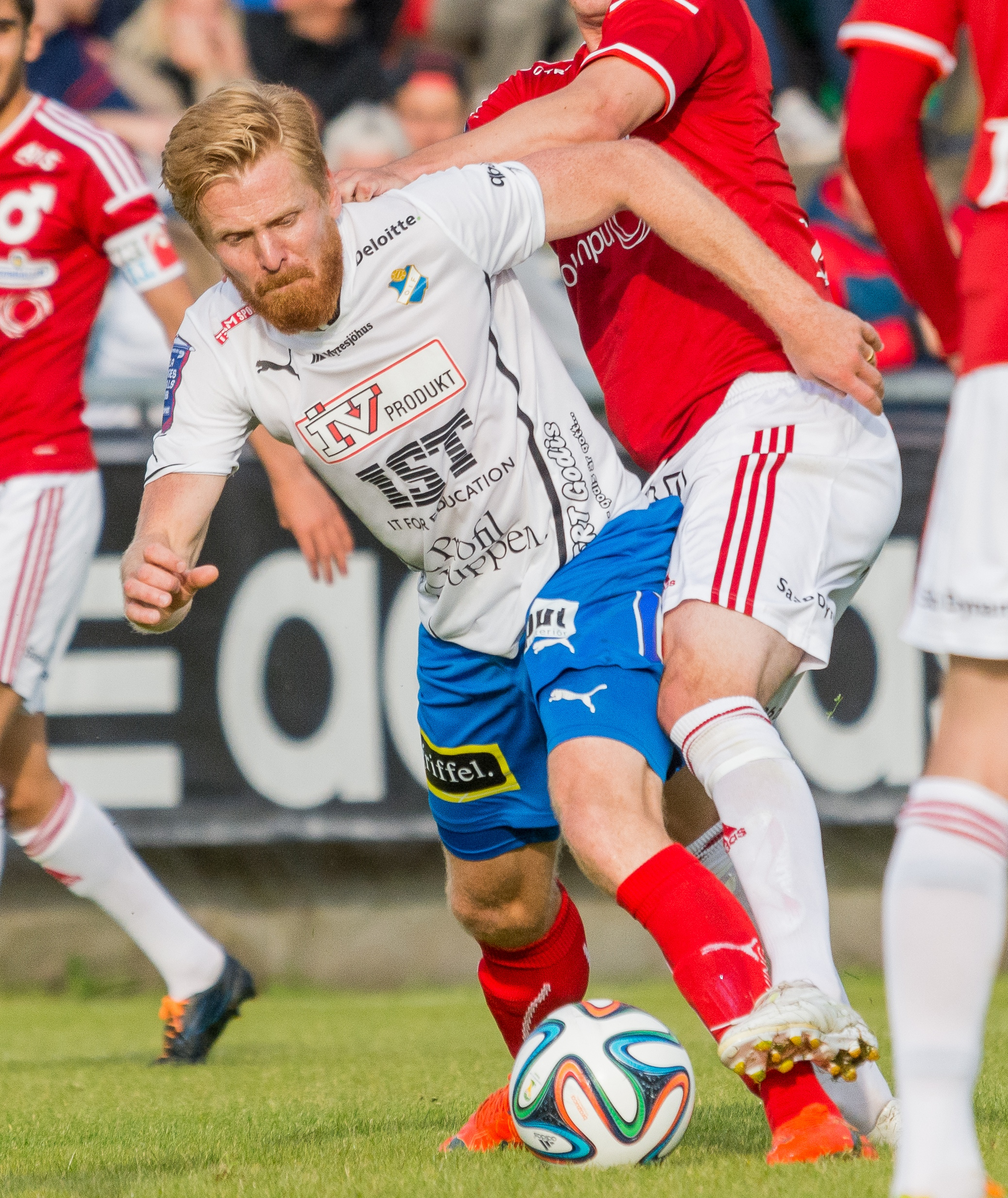

Personal information
- Full name: Josef Elvby
- Date of birth: 13 July 1982 (age 44)
- Place of birth: Värnamo, Sweden
- Height: 1.80 m (5 ft 11 in)
- Position: Midfielder

Team information
- Current team: Torre Levante

Youth career
- –1997: IFK Värnamo

Senior career*
Years	Team	Apps	(Gls)
1998–2005	IFK Värnamo		
2006–2008	Qviding FIF	81	(15)
2009–2013	BK Häcken	93	(6)
2013–2016	Östers IF	85	(0)
2017–	Torre Levante		
- * Club domestic league appearances and goals as of 9 March 2017 (UTC)

Josef Elvby, née Karlsson (born 13 July 1982) is a Swedish footballer. He is currently playing for Spanish amateur-side CF Torre Levante.

He began his footballing career playing as "Josef Karlsson". When he got married in June 2011 he changed his name to Elvby.

He started his career in IFK Värnamo, before he moved to Superettan side Qviding FIF. In 2009, he joined BK Häcken in Allsvenskan.

On June 30, 2011 he made his UEFA Europa League debut against UN Käerjéng 97. He played all six games in UEFA Europa League when BK Häcken in 2011 qualified to the third qualification round. In January 2013 he signed for Östers IF in Allsvenskan.
