= Mattias Östberg =

Swedish footballer

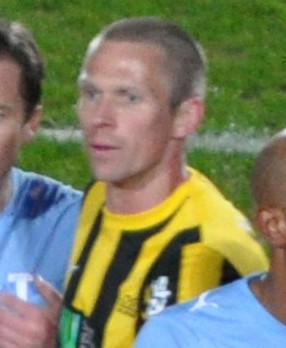

Personal information
- Full name: Bengt Pär Mattias Östberg
- Date of birth: 24 August 1977 (age 49)
- Place of birth: Falun, Sweden
- Height: 1.89 m (6 ft 2 in)
- Position: Defender

Team information
- Current team: Hanvikens SK

Youth career
- –1995: Östansbo IS

Senior career*
Years	Team	Apps	(Gls)
1995–1998	Ludvika FK	80	(12)
1999–2001	IFK Norrköping	65	(8)
2001	Stoke City	0	(0)
2002–2004	IK Brage	63	(13)
2005–2007	GAIS	58	(4)
2008–2012	BK Häcken	113	(6)
2012–2014	Djurgårdens IF	25	(1)
2015–	Hanvikens SK		
- * Club domestic league appearances and goals as of 11 November 2014

Mattias Östberg (born 24 August 1977) is a Swedish footballer who plays for Hanvikens SK in Swedish Division 4 as a defender.

== Career ==
Östberg began his career with Östansbo IS, before signing a professional contract with Ludvika FK. He also played with IFK Norrköping, before moving to England to play with then Second Division club Stoke City. He never made it into the senior squad, however played a game for the Youth Team, which they lost 3–1 to Walsall. However Östberg became a victim of the new transfer laws regarding international players, and as a result had to be released by Stoke.

Returning to Sweden, he signed with IK Brage, where he stayed for 2 seasons, before moving onto GAIS for 3 years, making over 50 appearances for the club. In 2008, he moved once more to BK Häcken.

During the 2011–12 Europa League first qualifying round Östberg scored in the opening rounds, 1–1 draw with Luxembourgian club Käerjéng 97. Häcken would go on to win 6–2 on aggregate after winning 5–1 in the second leg.
