= Jonas Bjurström =

Swedish footballer

Personal information
- Full name: Jonas Bjurström
- Date of birth: 24 March 1979 (age 47)
- Place of birth: Sweden
- Height: 1.77 m (5 ft 9 1/2 in)
- Position: Midfielder

Team information
- Current team: FC Trollhättan
- Number: 7

Youth career
- Alingsås IF

Senior career*
Years	Team	Apps	(Gls)
1998–2002	IFK Norrköping	76	(5)
2003–2004	Västra Frölunda IF	55	(12)
2005–2006	Trelleborgs FF	54	(8)
2007	Esbjerg fB	10	(0)
2007–2009	Trelleborgs FF	32	(0)
2009–2013	BK Häcken	48	(5)
2014–	FC Trollhättan		

International career
1999–2000	Sweden U21	8	(0)
- * Club domestic league appearances and goals as of 10 January 2012

Jonas Bjurström (born 24 March 1979) is a Swedish footballer who plays for FC Trollhättan as a midfielder.
