= Otto Martler =

Swedish footballer

Personal information
- Full name: Carl Otto Martler
- Date of birth: 14 April 1987 (age 39)
- Place of birth: Ronneby, Sweden
- Height: 1.90 m (6 ft 3 in)
- Position: Goalkeeper

Youth career
- –1995: Hyllinge GIF
- 1996–2003: Helsingborgs IF
- 2004–2005: Högaborgs BK

Senior career*
Years	Team	Apps	(Gls)
2005–2006	Gantofta IF		
2007–2012	Lunds BK	111	(0)
2013–2016	Falkenbergs FF	105	(1)
2017	IFK Norrköping	0	(0)
2017	GAIS	1	(0)
2018	Halmstads BK	0	(0)
- * Club domestic league appearances and goals as of 15 March 2018

Otto Martler (born 14 April 1987) is a Swedish footballer who as a goalkeeper.
