= Dioh Williams =

Liberian footballer (born 1984)

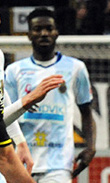
- Williams with Gefle

Personal information
- Full name: Dioh Clarence Williams
- Date of birth: 8 October 1984 (age 42)
- Place of birth: Monrovia, Liberia
- Height: 1.84 m (6 ft 0 in)
- Position: Forward

Youth career
- Black Star
- Tasha Academy

Senior career*
Years	Team	Apps	(Gls)
2002–2003	Floda BoIF	21	(14)
2003–2007	Häcken	120	(64)
2007–2010	AGF	67	(23)
2010	→ Alania Vladikavkaz	1	(0)
2011–2014	Häcken	63	(15)
2014–2016	Gefle	76	(36)
2018	T.C. Sports Club		

International career
2004–2016	Liberia	27	(10)
- * Club domestic league appearances and goals

Dioh Williams (born 8 October 1984) is a Liberian former professional footballer who played as a forward. He mostly spent his career in Sweden, representing top-tier clubs BK Häcken and Gefle IF. He has also played for clubs in Denmark and Russia. Williams was a member of the Liberia national team.

== Club career ==
=== Floda BoIF ===
Dioh Williams was one of several Liberian footballers who were brought to Sweden by Floda BolF by manager Stig Johanasson in the late 1990s after having been discovered at the Gothia Cup. These Liberian players included Dulee Johnson, Natus Ponnie, Jimmy Dixon and Sethen Hills.

=== BK Häcken ===
During the 2003 season, Dioh transferred to Allsvenskan club, BK Häcken, from Floda Bolf. Dioh had success at BK Hacken and became the Allsvenska-recognized top scorer with 20 goals during the 2006–2007 season. Dioh was a regular starter for the entire four years with BK Haken.

=== AGF Aarhus ===
In the summer of 2007, Dioh transfer from BK Hacken to Danish Superliga club AGF Aarhus for 1,10 Million euros and signed a 4 years contract. Dioh became an instant hit and scored regularly for AGF Aarhus.

=== Alania Vladikavkaz ===
Dioh was loaned from AGF Aarhus to Russian Premier League club Alania Vladikavkaz during the 2010–2011 season.

=== BK Hacken ===
On 1 January 2011, Dioh returned to his previous club BK Hacken and signed a 36-month contract.

=== Gefle IF ===
On 14 February 2014, Dioh transfer from BK Hacken to Gefle IF for an undisclosed fee and signed a three-year contract. Dioh was a regular goal scorer at Gefle IF and had a successful three season at the club. He left Gefle in December 2016.

=== T.C. Sports Club ===
On 28 February 2018, Williams signed with T.C. Sports Club in the Dhivehi Premier League on a free transfer.

== International career ==
Dioh became a member of Liberia national team in 2004. He represented Liberia in 2006 FIFA World Cup qualification matches, as well as the qualifying competition for the 2008 African Cup of Nations.
