= Nasiru Mohammed =

Ghanaian footballer (born 1994)

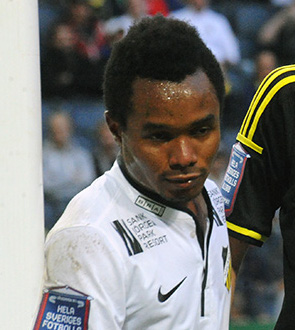
- Nasiru Mohammed portrait

Personal information
- Date of birth: 6 June 1994 (age 32)
- Place of birth: Kumasi, Ghana
- Height: 1.72 m (5 ft 7 1/2 in)
- Position: Winger

Team information
- Current team: EIF
- Number: 11

Youth career
- 2003–2009: Asawase
- 2010–2011: Rainbow FC

Senior career*
Years	Team	Apps	(Gls)
2012	Rainbow FC		
2012	→ BK Häcken (loan)	11	(4)
2013–2019	BK Häcken	154	(30)
2019–2021	Levski Sofia	29	(2)
2021	BK Häcken	2	(0)
2022	Norrby IF	8	(0)
2023	Trollhättan	4	(1)
2024–	EIF	73	(10)

International career
2010–2011	Ghana U17		
2011–2013	Ghana U20		
- * Club domestic league appearances and goals as of 1 November 2026

Nasiru Mohammed (born 6 June 1994) is a Ghanaian professional footballer who plays as a right winger for Finnish side Ekenäs IF in Ykkösliiga.

== Club career ==
=== Early career ===
Mohammed started his career at age nine by joining Kumasi based Lazio Football Club (under 12 to under 17) and later promoted to Rainbow FC a division three team in Kumasi Ghana at the time In 2010, he was promoted to the first team of the third tier Division Two League club of Rainbow FC. He played two years with the senior team and was later loaned out to BK Häcken in 2012.

=== BK Häcken ===
On 23 August 2012, Mohammed joined BK Häcken on an initial loan with a possibility of becoming a permanent move in future. He made his debut for BK Häcken on 26 August 2012 against IF Elfsborg. After only six minutes he scored his first goal which meant 2–2. Five minutes later he scored again. The match ended 4–2 to BK Häcken. After scoring four goals in only seven games, on 6 October 2012 BK Häcken pulled the sold option from Rainbow FC and he signed a four-year contract.

=== Levski Sofia ===
On 23 July 2019, he was sold for €250 000 to Levski Sofia in a three-year deal. He scored his first goal for the club in a 1–5 cup match victory against Spartak Varna on 25 September 2019. He scored again on 12 July 2020 against Lokomotiv Plovdiv, but unfortunately his team lost the match 1-2 and will not play in UEFA Europa League for the 2020/21 season. His third goal for Levski came on 19 September 2020 in league match against CSKA 1948 which his team won 3–0.

== International career ==
Mohammed was previously the captain of the Ghana national under-17 football team. He has played for the Ghana national under-20 football team since 2011. He was called up to the senior Ghana squad for a World Cup qualifier against Egypt in October 2017.

== Career statistics ==
As of 3 December 2024

Appearances and goals by club, season and competition
Club	Season	League			Cup		Continental		Other		Total	
Club	Season	Division	Apps	Goals	Apps	Goals	Apps	Goals	Apps	Goals	Apps	Goals
BK Häcken (loan)	2012	Allsvenskan	11	4	3	1	–		–		14	5
BK Häcken	2013	Allsvenskan	20	2	4	0	–		–		24	2
BK Häcken	2014	Allsvenskan	24	8	6	1	3	1	–		33	10
BK Häcken	2015	Allsvenskan	30	4	–		–		–		30	4
BK Häcken	2016	Allsvenskan	26	3	5	2	–		–		31	5
BK Häcken	2017	Allsvenskan	25	8	6	2	2	0	–		33	10
BK Häcken	2018	Allsvenskan	17	4	5	0	–		–		22	4
BK Häcken	2019	Allsvenskan	12	1	4	1	4	1	–		20	3
BK Häcken	Total		154	30	30	6	9	2	0	0	193	38
Levski Sofia	2019–20	Bulgarian First League	11	1	2	1	1	0	–		14	2
Levski Sofia	2020–21	Bulgarian First League	18	1	3	0	–		–		21	1
Levski Sofia	Total		29	2	5	1	1	0	0	0	35	3
BK Häcken	2021	Allsvenskan	2	0	0	0	1	0	–		3	0
Norrby IF	2022	Superettan	8	0	0	0	–		–		8	0
Trollhättan	2023	Ettan	4	1	1	0	–		–		5	1
Ekenäs IF	2024	Veikkausliiga	23	1	3	0	–		5	1	31	2
Career total			228	38	40	8	11	2	5	1	284	48

== Honours ==
BK Häcken

- Svenska Cupen (2): 2015–16, 2018–19
