= Daniel Forsell =

Swedish footballer

Personal information
- Full name: Karl Eric Daniel Forsell
- Date of birth: 4 January 1982 (age 44)
- Place of birth: Sweden
- Height: 1.78 m (5 ft 10 in)
- Position: Defender

Youth career
- Tuve IF

Senior career*
Years	Team	Apps	(Gls)
2001–2013	BK Häcken	149	(1)
2013–2015	Utsiktens BK	40	(2)
- * Club domestic league appearances and goals as of 1 January 2016

Daniel Forsell (born 4 January 1982) is a Swedish footballer who plays as a defender.
