= Daniel Janevski =

Swedish footballer

Personal information
- Full name: Daniel Mathias Knut Janevski
- Date of birth: 3 October 1992 (age 34)
- Height: 1.87 m (6 ft 2 in)
- Position: Defender

Youth career
- BK Häcken

Senior career*
Years	Team	Apps	(Gls)
2012–2014	FC Trollhättan	60	(1)
2015–2016	IK Oddevold	38	(5)
2017–2018	GAIS	22	(0)
2019–2021	Degerfors IF	49	(1)
2021	Mjøndalen IF	7	(0)
- * Club domestic league appearances and goals as of 17 December 2021

Daniel Janevski (born 3 October 1992) is a Swedish football defender.
