= Patrik Rosengren =

Swedish footballer and coach

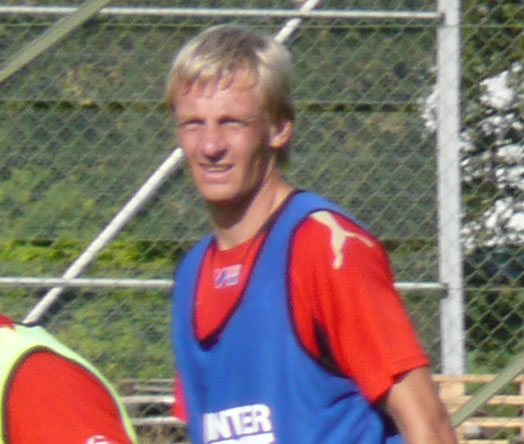

Personal information
- Full name: Patrik Hans-Erik Rosengren
- Date of birth: 25 July 1971 (age 55)
- Place of birth: Sölvesborg, Sweden
- Height: 1.91 m (6 ft 3 in)
- Position: Defender

Team information
- Current team: Mjällby AIF (U19)

Youth career
- Mjällby AIF

Senior career*
Years	Team	Apps	(Gls)
1990–2001	Mjällby AIF	261	(14)
2002–2008	Kalmar FF	164	(7)
2009–2012	Mjällby AIF	105	(3)
Total		530	(24)

Managerial career
- –2014: Mjällby AIF (U19)
- 2014–2015: Mjällby AIF (U21)
- 2015–2016: Mjällby AIF (assistant)
- 2016: Mjällby AIF
- 2016–: Mjällby AIF (academy)
- 2017–: Mjällby AIF (U19)
- * Club domestic league appearances and goals

Patrik Hans-Erik Rosengren (born 25 July 1971) is a Swedish football coach, currently for Mjällby AIF (U19), and former footballer who played as a defender.

== Career ==
Rosengren started his career at Mjällby AIF in 1990 and played there until 2001. Between 2002 and 2008 he played for Kalmar FF. On 17 November 2008 he signed with Mjällby for 1 year in Superettan. He helped the club gain promotion to Allsvenskan in 2009. In December 2012, he retired from professional football after playing his last match against IF Elfsborg on November 1, 2012.

Rosengren was the head coach of Mjällby AIF in 2016.

== Personal life ==
Rosengren is nicknamed Bagarn, Swedish slang for 'The Baker'. His son Otto Rosengren became a Mjällby player too, before making a move to Malmö FF.

== Honours ==
Kalmar FF

- Allsvenskan: 2008
- Svenska Cupen: 2007
