= Kari Arkivuo =

Finnish footballer (born 1983)

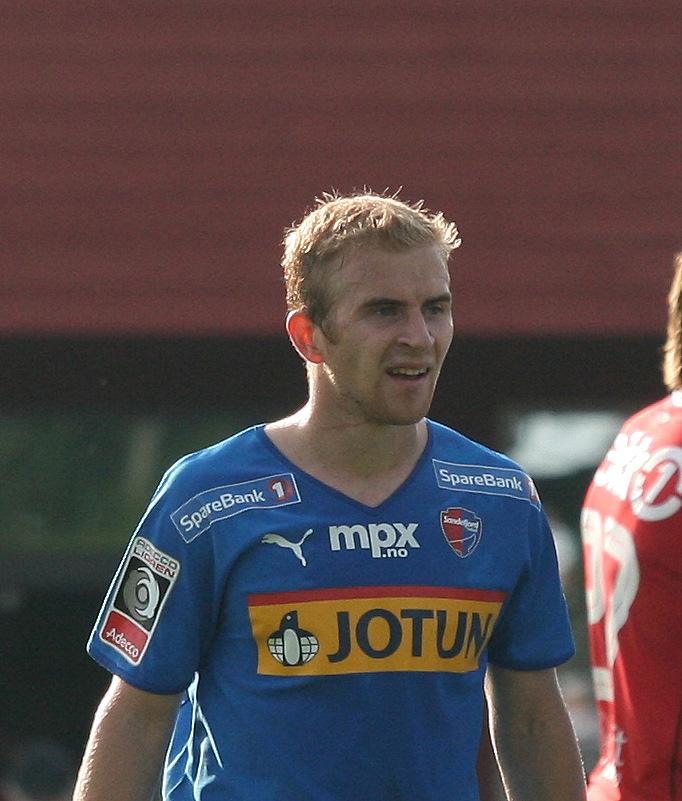

Personal information
- Date of birth: 23 June 1983 (age 43)
- Place of birth: Lahti, Finland
- Height: 1.77 m (5 ft 9 1/2 in)
- Position: Left back

Team information
- Current team: Lahti (assistant coach)

Youth career
- 1994–2003: Kuusysi

Senior career*
Years	Team	Apps	(Gls)
2001–2006	Lahti	101	(12)
2006–2008	Sandefjord	71	(5)
2008–2010	Go Ahead Eagles	46	(3)
2010–2019	BK Häcken	195	(5)
2020–2021	Lahti	45	(2)

International career
	Finland U21	15	(0)
2005–2017	Finland	57	(1)

Managerial career
- 2024–: Lahti (assistant)
Medal record
Finland national football team
Second place	Baltic Cup	2012
FC Lahti
Second place	Finnish Cup	2002
Second place	Finnish League Cup	2004
Second place	Finnish League Cup	2005
Sandefjord
Second place	Norwegian Football Cup	2006
BK Häcken
Second place	Allsvenskan	2012
First place	Svenska Cupen	2016
- * Club domestic league appearances and goals

Kari Arkivuo (born 23 June 1983) is a Finnish football coach and a former professional football defender who could play as left back and right back. He is currently working as an assistant coach of FC Lahti. Arkivuo was born in Lahti, Finland where he played for the local teams before moving to Sandefjord at age 22 in 2006.

Arkivuo made his international debut for Finland in November 2005, at the age of 22.

== Club career ==
=== FC Lahti ===
A product of his local FC Kuusysi, Arkivuo made his senior debut for FC Lahti on 3 May 2001 against Inter. He was able to appear in four league matches during his debut season, scoring once in the process. Arkivuo went on to make total of 101 league appearances and 12 goals for Lahti during his five-year stay.

=== Sandefjord ===
On 2006 he signed a three-year contract with Sandefjord in the Norwegian Premier League. He started his first season well, but suffered an injury in May and had to join Sandefjord's reserve team in order to gain play time. After season 2007 Sandefjord was relegated to Adeccoligaen. After just one season in the second tier Sandefjord returned to Tippeligaen.

=== Go Ahead Eagles ===
After struggling with injuries and facing a relegation with Sandefjord, Arkivuo left the club and joined the Eerste Divisie side Go Ahead Eagles in 2009.

=== Häcken ===
During the summer 2010 it was announced that Arkivuo had signed a 1+3 year-contract with Allsvenskan side BK Häcken.

=== FC Lahti ===
In October 2019 it was announced that Arkivuo would be returning to play for FC Lahti in Veikkausliiga.

== International career ==
After playing 15 times for the Finland U21, Arkivuo made his national team debut on 12 November 2005 in a friendly match against Estonia and went on scoring in the 2−2 home draw. After appearing mostly in friendlies, Arkivuo was called up by national coach Mixu Paatelainen for the Euro 2012 qualifying matches, where he has been playing as a right back. After the UEFA Euro 2012 qualifications he established himself as a regular in the national team and has appeared in every qualification campaign since.

== Coaching career ==
After his retirement, Arkivuo has worked as a youth talent coach for FC Lahti. On 18 July 2024, he started as an assistant coach of the FC Lahti first team.

== Personal life ==
He is commonly known by the nickname Arki-Kari amongst the supporters of Finland national team.

== Career statistics ==
=== Club ===
As of 31 October 2016

Club	Season	Division	League		Domestic Cups		Europe		Total	
Club	Season	Division	Apps	Goals	Apps	Goals	Apps	Goals	Apps	Goals
FC Lahti
FC Lahti	2001	Veikkausliiga	4	1	0	0	–		4	1
FC Lahti	2002	Veikkausliiga	26	0	0	0	–		26	0
FC Lahti	2003	Veikkausliiga	23	4	0	0	–		23	4
FC Lahti	2004	Veikkausliiga	26	5	0	0	–		26	5
FC Lahti	2005	Veikkausliiga	22	2	0	0	–		22	2
FC Lahti	Total		101	12	0	0	0	0	101	12
Sandefjord
Sandefjord	2006	Tippeligaen	19	1	0	0	–		19	1
Sandefjord	2007	Tippeligaen	24	3	0	0	–		24	3
Sandefjord	2008	1. divisjon	28	1	0	0	–		28	1
Sandefjord	Total		71	5	0	0	0	0	71	5
Go Ahead Eagles
Go Ahead Eagles	2008–09	Eerste Divisie	12	1	0	0	–		12	1
Go Ahead Eagles	2009–10	Eerste Divisie	32	2	4	0	–		36	2
Go Ahead Eagles	Total		44	3	4	0	0	0	48	3
Häcken
Häcken	2010	Allsvenskan	5	0	0	0	–		5	0
Häcken	2011	Allsvenskan	23	2	0	0	5	0	28	2
Häcken	2012	Allsvenskan	25	0	3	0	–		28	0
Häcken	2013	Allsvenskan	21	0	3	0	4	0	28	0
Häcken	2014	Allsvenskan	25	1	1	0	–		26	1
Häcken	2015	Allsvenskan	20	0	6	0	–		26	0
Häcken	2016	Allsvenskan	24	2	0	0	2	0	26	2
Häcken	2017	Allsvenskan	22	0	4	0	–		26	0
Häcken	2018	Allsvenskan	22	0	3	1	4	0	29	1
Häcken	2019	Allsvenskan	8	0	0	0	–		8	0
Häcken	Total		195	5	20	1	15	0	230	6
FC Lahti	2020	Veikkausliiga	21	0	6	0	–		27	0
FC Lahti	2021	Veikkausliiga	24	1	0	0	–		24	1
FC Lahti	Total		45	1	6	0	0	0	51	1
Career total			456	26	31	1	15	0	502	27

=== International ===
As of 13 January 2017

National team	Year	Apps	Goals
Finland
Finland	2005	1	1
Finland	2006	4	0
Finland	2007	0	0
Finland	2008	1	0
Finland	2009	1	0
Finland	2010	0	0
Finland	2011	6	0
Finland	2012	6	0
Finland	2013	11	0
Finland	2014	5	0
Finland	2015	6	0
Finland	2016	8	0
Finland	2017	2	0
Total		52	1

=== International goals ===
#	Date	Location	Opponent	Result	Competition
1.	12 November 2005	(Finland) Helsinki	Estonia	2−2	Friendly

== Honours ==
Häcken

- Svenska Cupen: 2016

Finland

- Baltic Cup runner-up: 2012
