= Emil Wahlström =

Swedish footballer

Personal information
- Date of birth: 2 March 1987 (age 39)
- Place of birth: Sweden
- Height: 1.83 m (6 ft 0 in)
- Position: Centre-back

Youth career
- Backa IF
- BK Häcken

Senior career*
Years	Team	Apps	(Gls)
2006–2018	BK Häcken	176	(2)
2019–2020	GAIS	23	(0)

International career
2006	Sweden U19	3	(0)
- * Club domestic league appearances and goals as of 00:27, 26 May 2019 (UTC)

Emil Wahlström (born 2 March 1987) is a Swedish footballer who plays as a centre-back.

== Honours ==
BK Häcken

- Svenska Cupen: 2015–16
