= Haris Skenderović =

Bosnian footballer

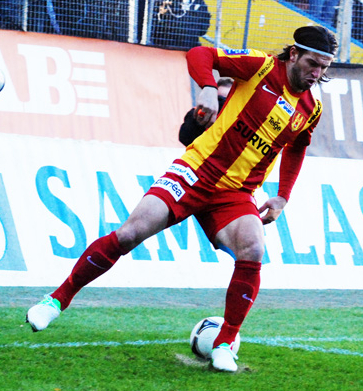

Personal information
- Date of birth: 3 November 1981 (age 44)
- Place of birth: Bužim, SFR Yugoslavia
- Height: 1.87 m (6 ft 2 in)
- Position: Defender

Youth career
- Vitez Bužim
- → Krajina Cazin (loan)

Senior career*
Years	Team	Apps	(Gls)
1999–2002	Jedinstvo Bihać		
2002–2006	Vasalund/Essinge IF		
2006–2008	US Monastir		
2008	Sirius	11	(0)
2009–2010	Syrianska	55	(4)
2011	Stabæk	9	(0)
2012–2013	Syrianska	52	(1)
2014	AFC Eskilstuna	9	(1)

International career
1999–2001	Bosnia and Herzegovina U21	3	(0)
- * Club domestic league appearances and goals as of 7 October 2013

Haris Skenderović (Bosnian pronunciation: [skenděːroʋitɕ]; born 3 November 1981) is a Bosnian retired footballer who last played for AFC Eskilstuna. He played as a central defender. Skenderović has previously played for Stabæk in Tippeligaen.

== Club career ==
Born in Bužim, SR Bosnia and Herzegovina, he started playing in the local team Vitez where he first became senior. At the very beginning of his career he will spend a stint on loan at FK Krajina Cazin before returning to Vitez from where he later moved to NK Jedinstvo Bihać.

== Career statistics ==
Season	Club	Division	League		Cup		Total	
Season	Club	Division	Apps	Goals	Apps	Goals	Apps	Goals
2008	IK Sirius	Superettan	11	0	0	0	11	0
2009	Syrianska	Superettan	27	0	2	0	27	0
2010	Syrianska	Superettan	28	4	0	0	28	4
2011	Stabæk	Tippeligaen	9	0	3	0	12	0
2012	Syrianska	Allsvenskan	25	1	1	0	26	1
2013	Syrianska	Allsvenskan	24	0	0	0	24	0
Career Total			124	5	6	0	130	5
