= Christoffer Källqvist =

Swedish footballer

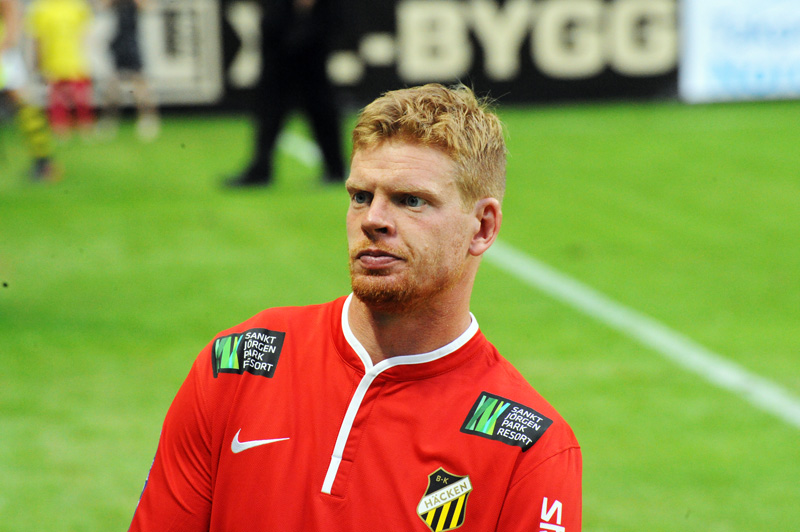

Personal information
- Full name: Patrik Christoffer Källqvist
- Date of birth: 26 August 1983 (age 43)
- Place of birth: Gothenburg, Sweden
- Height: 1.93 m (6 ft 4 in)
- Position: Goalkeeper

Youth career
- BK Häcken

Senior career*
Years	Team	Apps	(Gls)
2000–2020	BK Häcken	344	(0)

International career^{‡}
1998–2000	Sweden U17	16	(0)
2000–2001	Sweden U19	5	(0)
2002–2005	Sweden U21	20	(0)
- * Club domestic league appearances and goals as of 14 November 2018 ‡ National team caps and goals as of 20 August 2013

Patrik Christoffer Källqvist (born 26 August 1983) is a Swedish former professional football goalkeeper. He was a one-club man and spent his entire career at BK Häcken.

== Club career ==
During the 2018 Allsvenskan season, Källqvist announced his decision to retire from elite football at the end of the season. He underwent hip surgery in 2015, and has only played 5 Allsvenskan games for Häcken since then.

In his youth, Christoffer had a couple of trials with a various number of teams in England, such as Charlton Athletic and Ipswich Town.

== International career ==
Källqvist represented the Sweden U17, U19, and U21 teams a total of 41 times between the years 1998 and 2005.

== Honours ==
BK Häcken

- Svenska Cupen: 2015–16
