= Joel Anell =

Swedish footballer

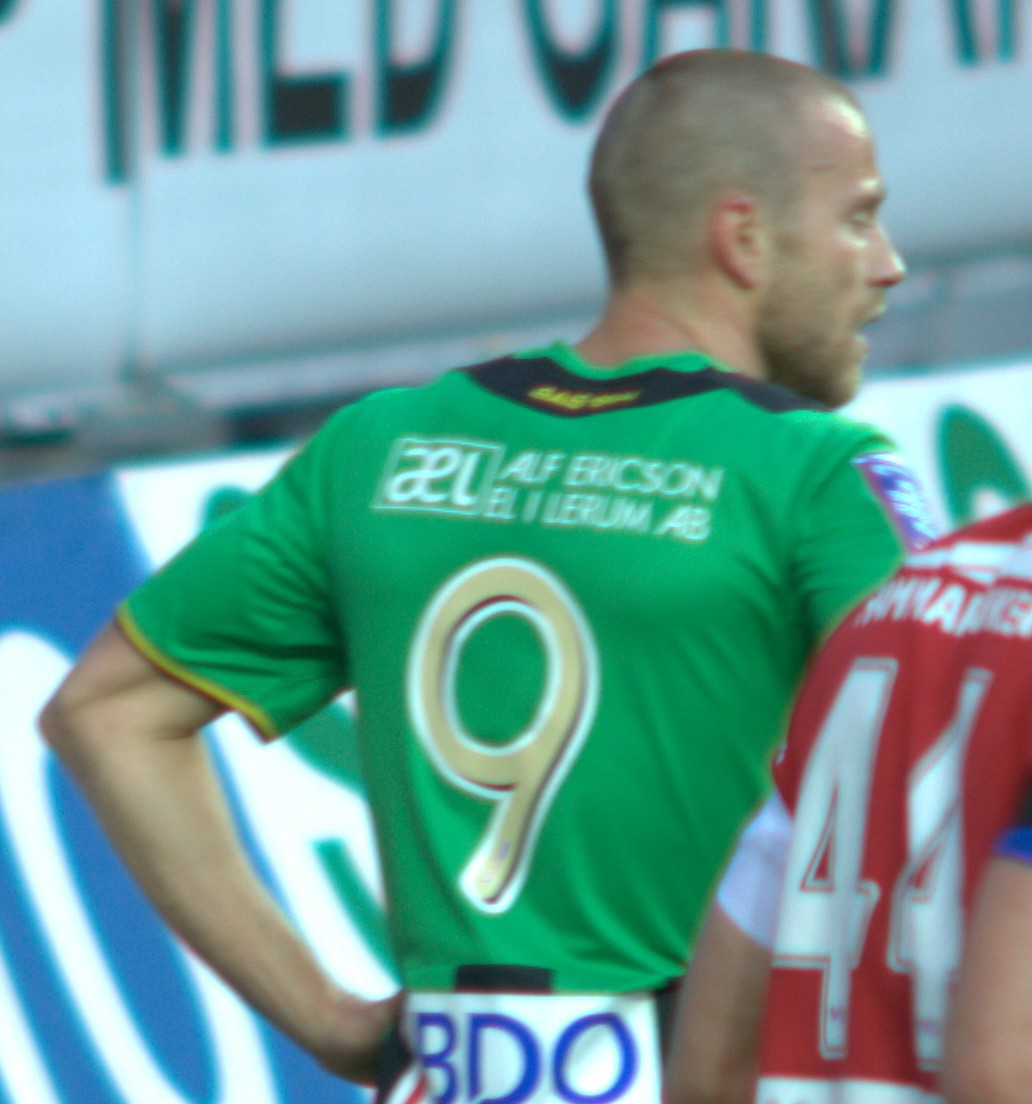

Personal information
- Full name: Joel Anell
- Date of birth: 16 January 1986 (age 40)
- Place of birth: Halmstad, Sweden
- Height: 1.76 m (5 ft 9 1/2 in)
- Position: Striker

Youth career
- –1999: Knäreds IK
- 2000–2004: Halmstads BK

Senior career*
Years	Team	Apps	(Gls)
2005–2007	Halmstads BK	28	(0)
2007–2008	Falkenbergs FF	36	(19)
2009–2012	IF Elfsborg	14	(1)
2010	→ GAIS (loan)	23	(2)
2011	→ Halmstads BK (loan)	12	(3)
2012	→ BK Häcken (loan)	11	(1)
2013–2015	GAIS	49	(14)

International career
2001–2003	Sweden U17	5	(0)
2009	Sweden U21	1	(0)
- * Club domestic league appearances and goals

Joel Anell (born 16 January 1986) is a Swedish former footballer who played as a striker.

== Career ==
Starting his career for Knäreds IK, he moved at the age of 14 to Halmstads BK, he played for the youth team until 2004 and in 2005 he played his first game for the senior team. Following the hard competition for a place in the starting lineup he left Halmstads BK during the summer transfer window for Falkenbergs FF. The 2008 season became a successful year for both Falkenbergs FF and Joel Anell, as the club reached its highest position ever in Superettan, ending up at 6th place, this much due to Anells success in scoring goals, during the season he scored 16 goals in 28 matches, becoming third highest goalscorer in the season. The success in the 2008 season did not go unnoticed as several clubs showed interest in signing him, ending with him returning to Allsvenskan as he signed for IF Elfsborg. However yet again having problem with reaching the starting lineup he was loaned to Allsvenska rivals GAIS in 2010 until the start of the 2010 FIFA World Cup, performing well GAIS decided to extend the loan until the end of the 2010 season.

On 29 July 2011 Halmstads BK announced that Joel Anell would return to the club on loan from Elfsborg for the duration of the 2011 season.
