= Per-Ola Ljung =

Swedish footballer and manager

Personal information
- Full name: Per-Ola Ljung
- Date of birth: 7 November 1967 (age 58)
- Place of birth: Sweden
- Position: Defender

Youth career
- Hästveda IF

Senior career*
Years	Team	Apps	(Gls)
–1987	IFK Hässleholm		
1988–1999	Helsingborgs IF	513	
1997	→ Watford (trial)	0	(0)
2000–2002	Landskrona BoIS		

Managerial career
- 2004: Torns IF
- 2005–2006: Helsingborgs Södra BIS
- 2007–2012: Helsingborgs IF (assistant)
- 2012–2014: Örebro SK
- 2014–2015: GAIS
- 2017–2019: Helsingborgs IF
- 2023: Trelleborgs FF
- * Club domestic league appearances and goals

Per-Ola Ljung (born 7 November 1967) is an unattached Swedish football manager and former player.

== Club career ==
Spending most of his career in his native Sweden, Ljung had a trial to forget for English side Watford in 1997. He made one appearance in the Football League Trophy; a 1–0 loss to Fulham.
