= Andreas Drugge =

Swedish footballer (born 1983)

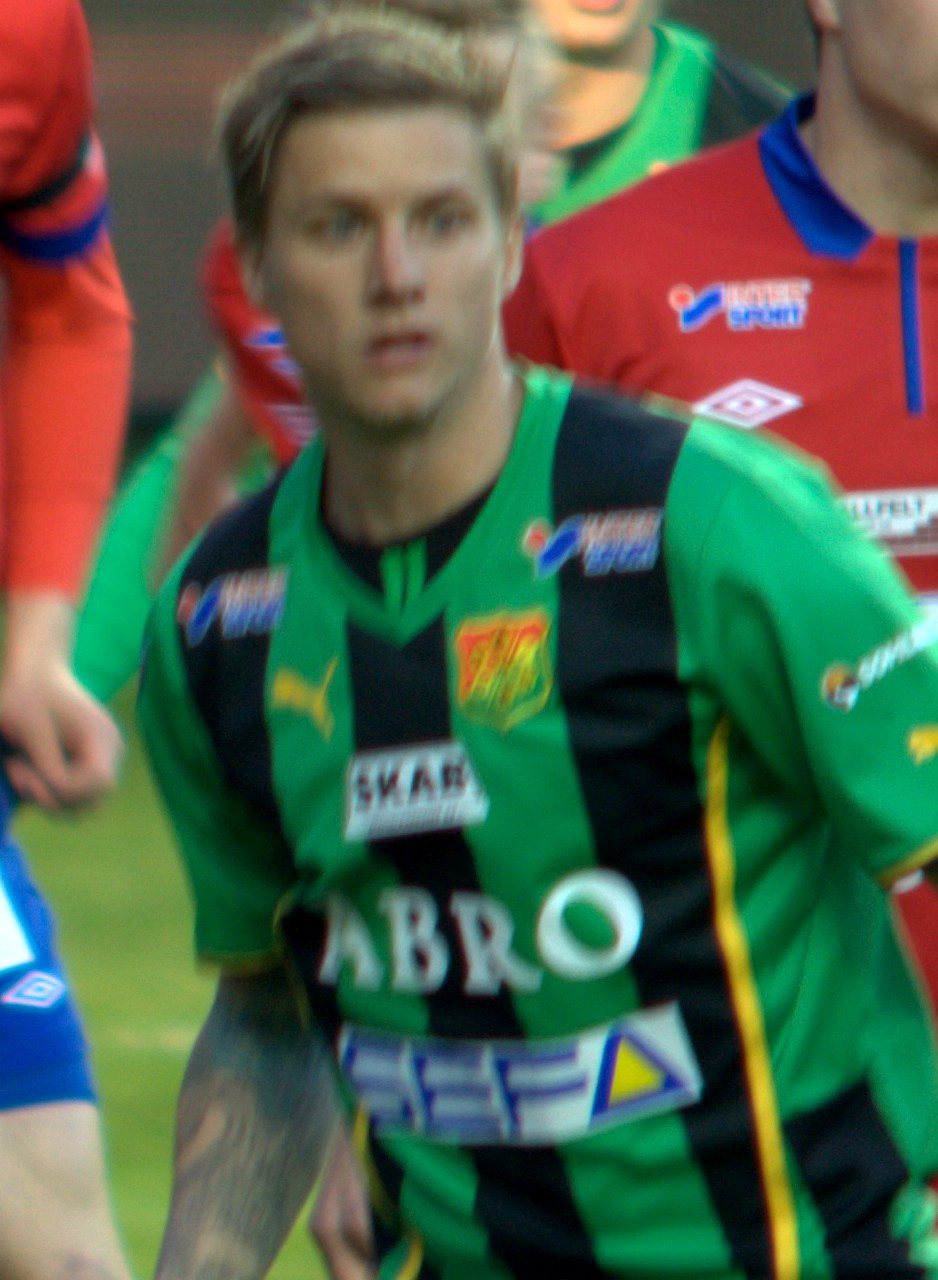

Personal information
- Full name: Andreas Drugge
- Date of birth: 20 January 1983 (age 43)
- Place of birth: Borås, Sweden
- Height: 1.85 m (6 ft 1 in)
- Positions: Attacking midfielder; forward

Team information
- Current team: IF Fram (manager)

Youth career
- Brämhults IK
- Mariedals IK
- IF Elfsborg

Senior career*
Years	Team	Apps	(Gls)
2000–2005	IF Elfsborg	61	(6)
2003	→ Falkenbergs FF (loan)	7	(0)
2005	→ FK Tønsberg (loan)	16	(4)
2006–2007	Degerfors IF	57	(19)
2008–2010	Trelleborgs FF	84	(20)
2011	IFK Göteborg	23	(1)
2012–2013	BK Häcken	14	(1)
2013–2014	GAIS	49	(12)
2015–2017	Fram		
2017–?	Stag		

International career
2000	Sweden U18	11	(2)
2001	Sweden U19	4	(1)
2002	Sweden U21	3	(0)

Managerial career
- –2023: Nanset women
- 2024–: Fram
- * Club domestic league appearances and goals

Andreas Drugge (born 20 January 1983) is a Swedish footballer who played as a forward.

== Personal life ==
Drugge is married to Charlotte Hysén, daughter of the former captain of Liverpool FC Glenn Hysén and sister to Tobias Hysén.

He is also parent to Fram Larvik forward Neo Drugge Hysén.

== Career ==
Drugge was recruited by IF Elfsborg 1999. Already at the age of 17 he made his debut in the club's senior team. Andreas was considered out of many to be a Swedish football 's greatest talents. In IF Elfsborg he played with players like Anders Svensson, Samuel Holmén, Johan Wiland and Fredrik Berglund.

In 2006 was he transferred by Degerfors IF, where he was trained out by the United States ladiescoach Tony Gustafsson.

2008 Trelleborg FF signed him and it was here that his career took off. Trelleborg changed his position, let him play like a No. 10 and during those three seasons Andreas were noted for 20 goals and 14 assists.

2011 one of the biggest team in the Swedish history, IFK Göteborg, transferred Andreas and he signed a three years contract with them.

BK Häcken signed Andreas for the 2012 season. While at the club, Andreas played alongside striker Waris Majeed.

During this period they chose to give Andreas a more defensive responsibility and used him as a playmaker. Nevertheless, he managed to record 12 points in the season 2013.

Ahead of the 2015 season, he moved to Norway to work a job outside of sports, and to play for third-tier team IF Fram Larvik.

== Managing career ==
Drugge coached Nanset IF's women's team until late 2023, when he was announced as new manager of IF Fram Larvik.
