= Benjamin Westman =

American-Swedish football manager (born 1976)

Personal information
- Full name: Benjamin Westman
- Date of birth: 20 July 1976 (age 50)
- Place of birth: United States
- Position: Forward

Youth career
- Varbergs GIF
- 1992: GAIS

Senior career*
Years	Team	Apps	(Gls)
1993–1994	GAIS	3	(0)
2005–2008	Utsiktens BK	75	(59)

Managerial career
- 2008–2015: GAIS (youth)
- 2012: GAIS (caretaker)
- 2015–2017: GAIS
- * Club domestic league appearances and goals

Benjamin "Banjo" Westman (born 20 July 1976) is an American-Swedish football manager.

== Playing career ==
Westman joined GAIS as a youth player in 1992 and was moved up to the first team the following year. In 1994, he moved to the United States where he had the ambition to join the newly started Major League Soccer.

Between 2005 and 2008 he played for lower league Gothenburg club Utsiktens BK.

== Managerial career ==
After working for seven years as a high school teacher Westman was recruited by GAIS in 2008 as a youth team coach. He also acquired his UEFA Pro Licence while working for Swedish manager Hans Backe at the New York Red Bulls. When GAIS manager Jan Mak was fired in October 2012 Westman took over as temporary caretaker manager.

Over the years he has also worked as an assistant coach to the Swedish youth national team for players born in 1996, who among other things, finished in third place at the 2013 FIFA U-17 World Cup.

At the end of the 2015 Superettan season Westman took over as the GAIS caretaker again and helped the club avoid relegation. This time he was hired permanently as their new head coach at the end of the year. He got fired on 4 June 2017.
