= Rambergsvallen =

Sports venue in Gothenburg, Sweden

Coordinates: 57°43′9″N 11°55′50″E

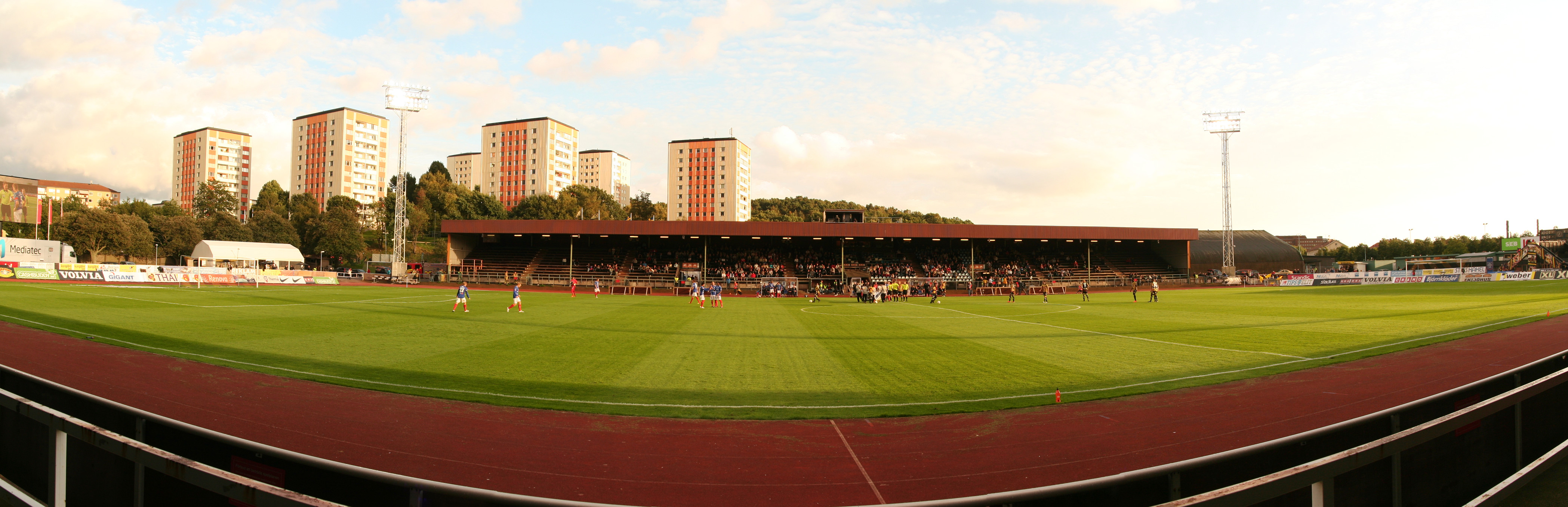
- Location: Gothenburg, Sweden
- Capacity: 7,000

Construction
- Opened: 18 August 1935
- Expanded: 1979, 1983
- Closed: 2013
- Demolished: 2014

Tenants
- BK Häcken (1944–2013)

Rambergsvallen was a multi-use stadium on Hisingen in Gothenburg, Sweden. It was used mostly for football matches and served as the home ground of BK Häcken. The stadium held 7,000 people and was opened 18 August 1935.
