= David Frölund =

Swedish footballer

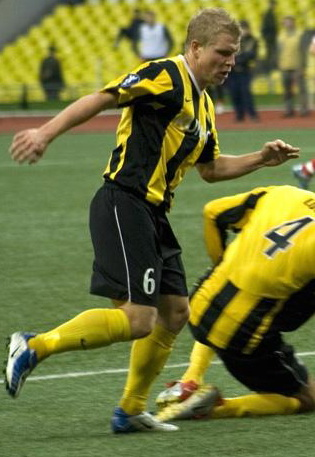

Personal information
- Full name: David Marek Frölund
- Date of birth: 4 June 1979 (age 47)
- Height: 1.72 m (5 ft 8 in)
- Position: Right-back

Youth career
- Backa IF

Senior career*
Years	Team	Apps	(Gls)
2000–2004	Örgryte	103	(2)
2005–2015	Häcken	219	(4)
2016–2017	Ljungskile	33	(0)

International career
2003	Sweden	1	(0)
- * Club domestic league appearances and goals as of 30 November 2017 (UTC)

David Marek Frölund (born 4 June 1979) is a Swedish former footballer who played as a right back, and occasionally as a midfielder. He started his youth career at Backa IF.

Until 2009 was known with the name David Marek, changing it to Frölund.

== Honours ==
Sweden

- King's Cup: 2003
