= Tom Söderberg =

Swedish footballer

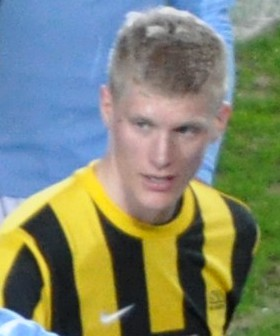

Personal information
- Full name: Tom Gunnar Söderberg
- Date of birth: 25 August 1987 (age 39)
- Place of birth: Norrköping, Sweden
- Height: 1.99 m (6 ft 6 in)
- Position: Defender

Youth career
- Viking FK
- Hisingsbacka FC
- BK Häcken

Senior career*
Years	Team	Apps	(Gls)
2006–2012	BK Häcken	93	(9)
2013–2014	IF Elfsborg	18	(3)
2014	→ Apollon Smyrnis (loan)	10	(1)
2014	→ Sogndal (loan)	7	(1)
2015	BK Häcken	0	(0)
2016	Dalkurd FF	0	(0)
Total		128	(14)

International career
2010	Sweden	1	(0)
- * Club domestic league appearances and goals

Tom Gunnar Söderberg (born 25 August 1987) is a Swedish former professional footballer who played as a center back. Beginning his career with BK Häcken in 2006, he went on to represent IF Elfsborg, Apollon Smyrnis, and Sogndal before retiring at Dalkurd FF in 2016. He won one cap for the Sweden national team in 2010.

== Club career ==
After spending his youth years in Norwegian side Viking FK, he transferred to Häcken in his home country in 2006. He stayed there for six seasons, playing a total of 108 games in all competitions and scoring 10 goals. As a Bosman player before the 2013 season, he signed a three-year contract for IF Elfsborg.

Although he played 18 games and scored 3 goals for Elfsborg, he was loaned out to Greek side Apollon Smyrnis. After six months in the Greek club, the loan deal ended, and a new loan deal to Norwegian side Sogndal was signed. The club has secured an option to buy the player after the 2014 season. On March 25, 2015 he returned to BK Häcken.

== International career ==
On 20 January 2010, Söderberg made his full international debut for the Sweden national team in a friendly game against Oman. He played the entire 90 minutes as a centre back alongside Per Karlsson in a game that ended 1–0 in Sweden's favor after a 35th-minute goal from Anders Svensson. This turned out to be Söderberg's sole international appearance for Sweden.

== Personal life ==
He is the older brother of fellow professional footballer Ole Söderberg.
