= Martin Ericsson =

Swedish footballer (born 1980)

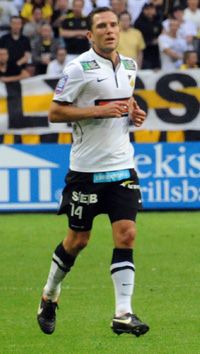

Personal information
- Full name: Martin Kjell Henrik Ericsson
- Date of birth: 4 September 1980 (age 46)
- Place of birth: Gustafs, Sweden
- Height: 1.78 m (5 ft 10 in)

Youth career
- Tunabro SK

Senior career*
Years	Team	Apps	(Gls)
1998–2000	IK Brage	72	(8)
2001–2004	IFK Göteborg	69	(13)
2004–2006	Aalborg BK	63	(16)
2006–2008	Brøndby IF	83	(19)
2009–2012	IF Elfsborg	54	(9)
2012	→ BK Häcken (loan)	15	(5)
2012–2016	BK Häcken	94	(19)
Total		450	(89)

International career
1998–1999	Sweden U19	10	(0)
2001	Sweden U21	11	(0)
2004–2009	Sweden	9	(0)
- * Club domestic league appearances and goals

Martin Kjell Henrik Ericsson (born 4 September 1980) is a Swedish former professional footballer who played as a midfielder. He represented IK Brage, IFK Göteborg, Aalborg BK, Brøndby IF, IF Elfsborg, and BK Häcken during a career that spanned between 1998 and 2016. He won nine caps for the Sweden men's national football team between 2004 and 2009.

== Club career ==
Born in Gustafs, he played for Swedish club Tunabro SK, before turning professional with IK Brage and IFK Göteborg. In the summer of 2004, he moved to Denmark to play for Aalborg BK in the Danish Superliga. He was the natural playmaker of the team, and quickly became the star of the Aalborg club. In the 2005 winter transfer window, he moved to defending Danish champions Brøndby IF, where he received the prestigious number 10 shirt. Ericsson scored in his Superliga debut match for Brøndby, a 3–0 win against archrivals Copenhagen. On 3 December 2009, he signed with IF Elfsborg.

== International career ==
After having appeared for the Sweden U19 and U21 teams, Ericsson made his full international debut for Sweden on 22 January 2004 in a friendly game against Norway. He won his ninth and final cap in a friendly game against Mexico on 28 January 2009 where he played for 87 minutes before being replaced by Gustav Svensson.

== Career statistics ==
=== International ===
Appearances and goals by national team and year
National team	Year	Apps	Goals
Sweden	2004	1	0
Sweden	2005	1	0
Sweden	2006	2	0
Sweden	2007	3	0
Sweden	2008	0	0
Sweden	2009	2	0
Total		9	0
