= 2012 Åtvidabergs FF season =

Åtvidabergs FF
2012 season
- Chairman: (Sweden) Jan Svensson
- Manager: (Sweden) Andreas Thomsson

In 2012 Åtvidabergs FF will compete in Allsvenskan and Svenska Cupen.

== 2012 season squad ==
Statistics prior to season start only

Squad Season 2012
No.	Player	Nat.	Birthdate	At ÅFF since	Previous club	League matches in ÅFF	Goals in ÅFF
Goalkeepers
1	Henrik Gustavsson	(Sweden)	21 October 1976	1997	Hjulsbro IK	290	0
20	Gustav Jansson	(Sweden)	24 February 1986	2010	Värmbols FC	0	0
Defenders
2	Allan Olesen	(Denmark)	20 May 1982	2012	IFK Mariehamn	0	0
3	Erik Moberg	(Sweden)	5 July 1986	2007	Motala AIF	95	6
4	George Tanzi	(Sweden)	7 May 1994	2010	BK Kenty	0	0
5	Daniel Hallingström	(Sweden)	10 February 1981	2002	Kalmar FF	269	24
13	Álberis da Silva	(Brazil)	2 December 1984	2009	IFK Norrköping	16	1
17	Andreas Johansson	(Sweden)	15 February 1991	2005	Grebo IK	1	0
18	Jesper Arvidsson	(Sweden)	1 January 1985	2007	IF Elfsborg	137	15
23	Anton Tinnerholm	(Sweden)	1 January 1985	2007	IK Östria Lambohov	52	4
24	Tom Pettersson	(Sweden)	25 March 1990	2012	FC Trollhättan	0	0
Midfielders
7	Kristian Bergström	(Sweden)	8 January 1974	2004	Malmö FF	233	56
8	Christoffer Karlsson	(Sweden)	27 January 1988	2008	Djurgårdens IF	170 (Note: Matches and goals from earlier spell with the club included)	2
9	Petrit Zhubi	(Albania)	8 May 1988	2012	Trollhättan	0	0
10	Tobias Nilsson	(Sweden)	20 February 1986	2012	Falkenbergs FF	0	0
12	Marinho	(Brazil)	5 July 1984	2008	FC Norrköping	82	3
16	Alain Ollé Ollé	(Cameroon)	11 April 1987	2012	Stabæk	0	0
19	Amir Suljic	(Sweden)	8 February 1989	2006	Linköpings FF	43	1
21	Emmanuel Dogbé	(Ghana)	6 June 1992	2012	Medeama SC	0	0
Forwards
11	Viktor Prodell	(Sweden)	29 February 1988	2009	Eskilstuna City	86	14
14	Oscar Möller	(Sweden)	15 April 1987	2007	Västerviks FF	136	36
15	Mattias Mete	(Sweden)	30 May 1987	2012	Västerås SK	0	0
22	Magnus Eriksson	(Sweden)	8 April 1990	2012	Västerås SK	30	15
Last updated: 13 April 2012

== Transfers ==
=== In ===
No.	Pos.	Nat.	Name	Age	EU	Moving from	Type	Transfer window	Ends	Transfer fee	Source
	MF	(Albania)	Zhubi	23	EU	FC Trollhättan	Transfer	Winter		N/A	Åtvidabergs FF
	DF	(Sweden)	Pettersson	22	EU	FC Trollhättan	Transfer	Winter		N/A	Åtvidabergs FF
	FW	(Sweden)	Mete	24	EU	Västerås SK	Transfer	Winter		N/A	Åtvidabergs FF
	MF	(Sweden)	Nilsson	26	EU	Falkenbergs FF	Transfer	Winter		N/A	fotbolltransfers.com
	MF	(Cameroon)	Ollé Ollé	25	EU	Stabæk (Norway)	Transfer	Winter		N/A	Åtvidabergs FF
	DF	(Denmark)	Olesen	29	EU	IFK Mariehamn (Finland)	Transfer	Winter		N/A	Åtvidabergs FF
	MF	(Ghana)	Dogbé	19	EU	Medeama SC (Ghana)	Transfer	Winter		N/A	Åtvidabergs FF

=== Out ===
No.	Pos.	Nat.	Name	Age	EU	Moving to	Type	Transfer window	Transfer fee	Source
	DF	(Norway)	Strømnes	25	EU		Contract ended	Winter		svenskalag.se
	DF	(Sweden)	Melin	21	EU		Contract ended	Winter		svenskalag.se
	MF	(Nigeria)	Eboagwu	25	EU		Contract ended	Winter		svenskalag.se
	MF	(Sweden)	Karlsson	28	EU		Contract ended	Winter		svenskalag.se
	MF	(Sweden)	Kalludja	20	EU		Contract ended	Winter		svenskalag.se
	MF	(Sweden)	Konradsson	20	EU		Contract ended	Winter		svenskalag.se
	FW	(Sweden)	Swärd	22	EU	Motala AIF	transfer	Winter		Åtvidabergs FF
	FW	(Serbia)	Radetinac	26	EU	Mjällby AIF	transfer	Winter		Mjällby AIF
	DF	(Sweden)	Borg	N/A	EU	Motala AIF	transfer	Winter		Motala AIF

Last updated: 13 April 2012

== Appearances and goals ==
As of 17 July 2012

No.	Pos	Nat	Player	Total		Allsvenskan		Svenska Cupen	
No.	Pos	Nat	Player	Apps	Goals	Apps	Goals	Apps	Goals
1	GK	(Sweden) SWE	Henrik Gustavsson	7	0	7	0	0	0
2	DF	(Denmark) DEN	Allan Olesen	12	0	12	0	0	0
3	DF	(Sweden) SWE	Erik Moberg	0	0	0	0	0	0
4	DF	(Sweden) SWE	George Tanzi	0	0	0	0	0	0
5	DF	(Sweden) SWE	Daniel Hallingström	15	1	15	1	0	0
7	MF	(Sweden) SWE	Kristian Bergström	15	1	15	1	0	0
8	MF	(Sweden) SWE	Christoffer Karlsson	2	0	2	0	0	0
9	MF	(Albania) ALB	Petrit Zhubi	11	2	11	2	0	0
10	MF	(Sweden) SWE	Tobias Nilsson	15	0	15	0	0	0
11	FW	(Sweden) SWE	Viktor Prodell	14	12	14	12	0	0
12	MF	(Brazil) BRA	Marinho	14	0	14	0	0	0
13	DF	(Brazil) BRA	Álberis da Silva	11	1	11	1	0	0
14	FW	(Sweden) SWE	Oscar Möller	13	1	13	1	0	0
15	FW	(Sweden) SWE	Mattias Mete	4	1	4	1	0	0
16	MF	(Cameroon) CMR	Alain Junior Ollé Ollé	6	0	6	0	0	0
17	DF	(Sweden) SWE	Andreas Johansson	0	0	0	0	0	0
18	DF	(Sweden) SWE	Jesper Arvidsson	14	3	14	3	0	0
19	MF	(Sweden) SWE	Amir Suljic	11	1	11	1	0	0
20	GK	(Sweden) SWE	Gustav Jansson	9	0	9	0	0	0
21	MF	(Ghana) GHA	Emmanuel Dogbe	0	0	0	0	0	0
22	FW	(Sweden) SWE	Magnus Eriksson	15	7	15	7	0	0
23	DF	(Sweden) SWE	Anton Tinnerholm	13	1	13	1	0	0
24	DF	(Sweden) SWE	Tom Pettersson	8	1	8	1	0	0

== Matches ==
=== Pre-season/friendlies ===
Match 1; 28 January 2012	Åtvidabergs FF	4–1	IFK Värnamo	Kopparvallen, Åtvidaberg
13:00 CET	Nilsson 23'; Johansson 60'; Prodell 66'; Tinnerholm 83'; Eriksson (yellow card); Pettersson (yellow card)	(report) (in Swedish)	72' (pen.) Ferizi	Attendance: 532; Referee: Magnus Ahlsén

Match 2; 4 February 2012	Åtvidabergs FF	1–0	Mjällby AIF	Kopparvallen, Åtvidaberg
15:00 CET	Zhubi 23'; Nilsson (yellow card); Pettersson (yellow card)	(report) (in Swedish)		Attendance: 352; Referee: Jim Petersson

Match 3; 11 February 2012	Åtvidabergs FF	0–3	Kalmar FF	Kopparvallen, Åtvidaberg
13:00 CET	Nilsson (yellow card) da Silva (red card)	(report) (in Swedish)	17' (pen.) Thorbjörnsson; 63' McDonald; 66' Mendes	Attendance: 570; Referee: Jonas Eriksson

Match 4; 15 February 2012	Åtvidabergs FF	2–0	Motala AIF	Kopparvallen, Åtvidaberg
18:00 CET	Möller 25'; Dogbe 56'; Eriksson (yellow card); Ásgeirsson (red card)	(report) (in Swedish)		Attendance: 200; Referee: Patric Nyrenvall

Match 5; 16 February 2012	Åtvidabergs FF	3–2	Eskilstuna City	Kopparvallen, Åtvidaberg
18:00 CET	Pettersson 68'; Arvidsson 74'; Prodell 79'	(report) (in Swedish)	43' Fritzell; 45' Wahlström	Attendance: 240; Referee: Magnus Ahlsén

Match 6; 25 February 2012	Åtvidabergs FF	4–3	GAIS	Kopparvallen, Åtvidaberg
13:00 CET	Nilsson 28'; Ollé Ollé 75'; Prodell 86'; Eriksson 91' (yellow card)	(report) (in Swedish)	58', 70' Ijeh; 65' Wánderson	Attendance: 744; Referee: Jim Petersson

Match 7; 3 March 2012	IFK Norrköping	3–1	Åtvidabergs FF	Idrottsparken, Norrköping
13:00 CET	Ajdarević 32'; Þorvaldsson 75'; Thelin 86'	(report) (in Swedish)	77' Prodell	Attendance: 2 537; Referee: Stefan Johannesson

Match 8; 11 March 2012	Syrianska FC	0–2	Åtvidabergs FF	N/A, Turkey
15:00 CET	Marinho 10'; Möller 73'	(report) (in Swedish)		Attendance: N/A; Referee: N/A

Match 9; 17 March 2012	Åtvidabergs FF	0–2	Akropolis IF	Kopparvallen, Åtvidaberg
13:30 CET	Bergström 2'; Eriksson 20'; Nilsson 68'; Tinnerholm (yellow card)	(report) (in Swedish)		Attendance: 561; Referee: Mohammed Al-Hakim

Match 10; 24 March 2012	Degerfors IF	1–2	Åtvidabergs FF	Stora Valla, Degerfors
13:00 CET	Olsson 28'; Sundgren (red card)	(report) (in Swedish)	13' Prodell; 68' Bergström; (yellow card) Nilsson; (yellow card) Pettersson	Attendance: ~300; Referee: Tobias Mattsson

=== Allsvenskan ===
Round 1; 2 April 2012	Örebro SK	3–4	Åtvidabergs FF	Behrn Arena, Örebro
19:00 CEST	Atashkadeh 23', 42' (yellow card) 48'; Wikström (yellow card) 54'; Bamberg 77'; Grahn (yellow card) 84'; Saeid (yellow card) 86'	(report) (in Swedish)	10', 33' Prodell; 19' Suljic; 45+2' Arvidsson	Attendance: 6 729; Referee: Daniel Stålhammar

Round 2; 6 April 2012	Åtvidabergs FF	2–1	GAIS	Kopparvallen, Åtvidaberg
15:00 CEST	Hallingström 61' (yellow card) 48'; Arvidsson 88'; Tinnerholm (yellow card) 89' (yellow-red card) 90'	(report) (in Swedish)	(yellow card) 60' Florén; 70' (yellow card) 90+3' Olsson; (yellow card) 77' Angus	Attendance: 4 113; Referee: Johan Hamlin

Round 3; 10 April 2012	Åtvidabergs FF	6–1	Gefle IF	Kopparvallen, Åtvidaberg
19:00 CEST	Prodell 4', 43'; Eriksson 25', 73' da Silva 64'; Bergström 66'	(report) (in Swedish)	49' Dahlberg; (yellow card) 68' Faltsetas; (yellow card) 81' Bernhardsson	Attendance: 2 863; Referee: Bojan Pandzic

Round 4; 15 April 2012	Mjällby AIF	2–0	Åtvidabergs FF	Strandvallen, Mjällby
17:30 CEST	Ekenberg (yellow card) 31'; Ericsson (yellow card) 64' (goal) 67'; Radetinac 78'	(report) (in Swedish)	(red card) 57' da Silva; (yellow card) 57' Marinho; (yellow card) 71' Bergström	Attendance: 2 831; Referee: Markus Strömbergsson

Round 5; 21 April 2012	Åtvidabergs FF	1–2	Helsingborgs IF	Kopparvallen, Åtvidaberg
14:00 CEST	Marinho (yellow card) 22'; Prodell 68'	(report) (in Swedish)	(yellow card) 21' Lindström; (yellow card) 42' Gashi; 65', 70' Sundin	Attendance: 4 219; Referee: Tobias Mattsson

Round 6; 28 April 2012	IFK Göteborg	2–1	Åtvidabergs FF	Gamla Ullevi, Gothenburg
16:00 CEST	Stiller 41', 45+1'; Wæhler (yellow card) 61' (yellow-red card) 68'	(report) (in Swedish)	69' Arvidsson; (yellow card) 90' Nilsson; (yellow card) 90+1' Eriksson	Attendance: 11 855; Referee: Andreas Ekberg

Round 7; 2 May 2012	Åtvidabergs FF	0–3	BK Häcken	Kopparvallen, Åtvidaberg
19:00 CEST	Eriksson (yellow card) 76' da Silva (yellow card) 77'	(report) (in Swedish)	25' Makondele; (yellow card) 39' Khan; 54' Drugge; (yellow card) 79' Arkivuo; (yellow card) 84' Anklev; 87' Waris	Attendance: 3 620; Referee: Martin Strömbergsson

Round 8; 6 May 2012	Malmö FF	2–1	Åtvidabergs FF	Swedbank Stadion, Malmö
17:30 CEST	Ranégie 67', 90+2'	(report) (in Swedish)	(yellow card) 23' Ollé Ollé; (yellow card) 72' da Silva; 88' Möller; (yellow card) 90+1' Olesen	Attendance: 14 112; Referee: Johan Hamlin

Round 9; 12 May 2012	Djurgårdens IF	1–1	Åtvidabergs FF	Olympic Stadium, Stockholm
19:00 CEST	Keene (yellow card) 32'; Gustafsson (yellow card) 78'; Santos 79'	(report) (in Swedish)	(yellow card) 31' Ollé Ollé; (yellow card) 52' Tinnerholm; 86' Zhubi	Attendance: 7 305; Referee: Tobias Mattsson

Round 10; 16 May 2012	Åtvidabergs FF	1–0	Syrianska FC	Kopparvallen, Åtvidaberg
19:00 CEST	Bergström (yellow card) 21'; Eriksson 45'; Tinnerholm (yellow card) 67'	(report) (in Swedish)	(yellow card) 61' (yellow-red card) 67' Touma	Attendance: 3 729; Referee: Andreas Ekberg

Round 11; 20 May 2012	Åtvidabergs FF	3–0	Kalmar FF	Kopparvallen, Åtvidaberg
15:00 CEST	Hallingström (yellow card) 19'; Prodell 33'; Eriksson 38'; Zhubi 54'	(report) (in Swedish)	(yellow card) 23' Mendes	Attendance: 4 932; Referee: Martin Hansson

Round 12; 23 May 2012	IFK Norrköping	2–2	Åtvidabergs FF	Idrottsparken, Norrköping
19:00 CEST	Ajdarević 26'; Florén (yellow card) 76'; Nyman 80'	(report) (in Swedish)	12' Prodell; (yellow card) 71' Hallingström; 88' Mete	Attendance: 15 715; Referee: Stefan Johannesson

Round 13; 30 June 2012	Åtvidabergs FF	5–1	IF Elfsborg	Kopparvallen, Åtvidaberg
16:00 CEST	Prodell 9', 76'; Pettersson 28'; Eriksson 50' (pen.); Olesen (yellow card) 84'; Tinnerholm 88'	(report) (in Swedish)	(yellow card) 38' Jawo; (yellow card) 72' (goal) 74' J. Larsson	Attendance: 5 016; Referee: Daniel Stålhammar

Round 14; 7 July 2012	GIF Sundsvall	3–3	Åtvidabergs FF	Norrporten Arena, Sundsvall
16:00 CEST	Holster 2'; Helg 7'; Skúlason (yellow card) 60'; Eklund 85'	(report) (in Swedish)	37' Eriksson; 44', 89' Prodell	Attendance: 4 621; Referee: Kristoffer Karlsson

Round 15; 14 July 2012	Åtvidabergs FF	2–0	AIK	Kopparvallen, Åtvidaberg
16:00 CEST	Hallingström (yellow card) 28'; Eriksson 75'; Prodell 81'	(report) (in Swedish)	37' Backman	Attendance: 7 621; Referee: Martin Strömbergsson

Round 16; 22 July 2012	AIK	1–0	Åtvidabergs FF	Råsunda Stadium, Solna Municipality
18:30 CEST	Lorentzson 43'; Borges (yellow card) 89'	Summary	(yellow card) 32' Pettersson	Attendance: 9,231; Referee: Andreas Ekberg

Round 17; 27 July 2012	Åtvidabergs FF	1–1	Örebro SK	Kopparvallen, Åtvidaberg
19:00 CEST	Pettersson 46'; Marinho (yellow card) 83'	Summary	(yellow card) 69' Yasin; 77' Astvald	Attendance: 4,420; Referee: Jonas Eriksson

Round 18; 4 August 2012	GAIS	2–2	Åtvidabergs FF	Gamla Ullevi, Gothenburg
16:00 CEST	Ijeh 60'; Aubynn (yellow card) 75' (goal) 83' (pen.)	Summary	15', 62' Eriksson; (yellow card) 45' Hallingström	Attendance: 3,119; Referee: Stefan Johannesson

Round 19; 11 August 2012	Syrianska FC	2–2	Åtvidabergs FF	Södertälje Fotbollsarena, Södertälje
16:00 CEST	Aganović 23'; Tinnerholm 25' (o.g.); Chanko (yellow card) 50'	Summary	33' Eriksson; 53' Mete; (yellow card) 90' Abubakari	Attendance: 1,799; Referee: Bojan Pandzic

Round 20; 27 August 2012	Åtvidabergs FF	1–1	IFK Norrköping	Kopparvallen, Åtvidaberg
19:05 CEST	Prodell (yellow card) 36'; Mete (yellow card) 73'; Eriksson 89'	Summary	(yellow card) 14' Telo; 32' (yellow card) 90+2' Nyman; (yellow card) 73' Wiklander	Attendance: 8,600; Referee: Jonas Eriksson

Round 21; 31 August 2012	BK Häcken	5–2	Åtvidabergs FF	Rambergsvallen, Gothenburg
19:00 CEST	Makondele 37', 71'; Waris Majeed 58', 82'; Mohammed 64'	Summary	50' Abubakari; 90' Mete	Attendance: 3,407; Referee: Martin Strömbergsson

Round 22; 17 September 2012	Åtvidabergs FF	0–1	Malmö FF	Kopparvallen, Åtvidaberg
19:05 CEST	Álberis da Silva (yellow card) 57'; Pettersson (yellow card) 90+2'	Summary	73' (pen.) Ricardinho; (yellow card) 87' Dahlin; (yellow card) 90+3' Friberg	Attendance: 4,637; Referee: Michael Lerjeus

Round 23; 23 September 2012	Kalmar FF	2–0	Åtvidabergs FF	Guldfågeln Arena, Kalmar
17:30 CEST	Dauda 26', 80'	Summary	(yellow card) 85' Abubakari	Attendance: 4,893; Referee: Martin Strömbergsson

Round 24; 26 September 2012	Åtvidabergs FF	2–1	Djurgårdens IF Fotboll	Kopparvallen, Åtvidaberg
18:00 CEST	Bergström 69'; Álberis da Silva (yellow card) 74'; Möller 77'	Summary	(yellow card) 42' Keene; 48' Bergström	Attendance: 4,267; Referee: Magnus Ahlsèn

Round 25; 30 September 2012	Helsingborgs IF	3–0	Åtvidabergs FF	Olympia, Helsingborg
15:00 CEST	Atta 26'; Bouaouzan (yellow card) 58'; Álvaro Santos 68'; Đurđić 87'	Summary	(yellow card) 8' Möller; (yellow card) 79' Prodell; (yellow card) 90' Pettersson	Attendance: 7,114; Referee: Andreas Ekberg

Round 26; 6 October 2012	Åtvidabergs FF	1–2	IFK Göteborg	Kopparvallen, Åtvidaberg
16:00	Prodell 36'; Suljić (yellow card) 45'; Arvidsson (yellow card) 67'; Moberg (yellow card) 80'	Summary	(yellow card) 12' Jónsson; 32' (yellow card) 65' Gerzić; (yellow card) 40' Allansson; 68' Stiller	Attendance: 5,257; Referee: Tobias Mattsson

Round 27; 20 October 2012	Gefle IF	1–2	Åtvidabergs FF	Strömvallen, Gävle
14:00	Oremo 80'	Summary	19' Imad Zatara; 57' Pettersson	Attendance: 2,337; Referee: Jonas Eriksson

Round 28; 28 October 2012	Åtvidabergs FF	0–0	Mjällby AIF	Kopparvallen, Åtvidaberg
17:30	Abubakari (yellow card) 65'; Olesen (yellow card) 88'; Arvidsson (yellow card) 90+1'	Summary	(yellow card) 54' Henderson	Attendance: 2,831; Referee: Michael Lerjeus

Round 29; 31 October 2012	Åtvidabergs FF	2–2	GIF Sundsvall	Kopparvallen, Åtvidaberg
19:00	Prodell 34'; Moberg (yellow card) 43'; Pettersson (yellow card) 45+1'; Mete 88'	Summary	(yellow card) 62' Skúlason; (yellow card) 65' Fjóluson; 81' Risholt; 83' Forsberg	Attendance: 2,567; Referee: Johan Hamlin

Round 30; 4 November 2012	IF Elfsborg	1–1	Åtvidabergs FF	Borås Arena, Borås
15:00	Ishizaki 30'; Hiljemark (yellow card) 59'	Summary	(yellow card) 60' Abubakari; 76' Prodell; (yellow card) 79' Möller; (yellow card) 88' Hallingström	Attendance: 16,176; Referee: Stefan Johannesson

== Competitions ==
=== Allsvenskan ===
==== Standings ====
Pos	Team	Pld	W	D	L	GF	GA	GD	Pts	Qualification or relegation
6	Helsingborgs IF	30	13	11	6	52	33	+19	50	
7	IFK Göteborg	30	9	12	9	36	41	−5	39	Qualification to Europa League second qualifying round (Note: IFK Göteborg qualified for the 2013–14 UEFA Europa League second qualifying round by winning the 2012–13 Svenska Cupen.)
8	Åtvidabergs FF	30	9	10	11	48	48	0	37	
9	Djurgårdens IF	30	8	13	9	37	40	−3	37	
10	Kalmar FF	30	10	7	13	36	45	−9	37	

Source: svenskfotboll.se (in Swedish)
Rules for classification: 1) points; 2) goal difference; 3) number of goals scored.

==== Results summary ====
Overall								Home						Away					
Pld	W	D	L	GF	GA	GD	Pts	W	D	L	GF	GA	GD	W	D	L	GF	GA	GD
30	9	10	11	48	47	+1	37	7	4	4	27	15	+12	2	6	7	21	32	−11

Last updated: 4 November 2012.
Source: SvFF.se (in Swedish)

==== Results by round ====
Round	1	2	3	4	5	6	7	8	9	10	11	12	13	14	15	16	17	18	19	20	21	22	23	24	25	26	27	28	29	30
Ground	A	H	H	A	H	A	H	A	A	H	H	A	H	A	H	A	H	A	A	H	A	H	A	H	A	H	A	H	H	A
Result	W	W	W	L	L	L	L	L	D	W	W	D	W	D	W	L	D	D	D	D	L	L	L	W	L	L	W	D	D	D
Position	1	1	1	1	3	6	9	10	10	9	6	6	6	6	4	9	9	9	9	9	9	9	11	11	11	11	10	10	8	8

Updated to match(es) played on 4 November 2012. Source: SvFF.se (in Swedish)
A = Away; H = Home; W = Win; D = Draw; L = Loss

== Season statistics ==
=== Superettan ===
Name	Matches	Goals
(Sweden) Viktor Prodell	14	12
(Sweden) Magnus Eriksson	15	7
(Sweden) Jesper Arvidsson	14	3
(Albania) Petrit Zhubi	11	2
(Sweden) Daniel Hallingström	15	1
(Sweden) Kristian Bergström	15	1
(Brazil) Álberis da Silva	11	1
(Sweden) Amir Suljic	11	1
(Sweden) Oscar Möller	13	1
(Sweden) Mattias Mete	4	1
(Sweden) Anton Tinnerholm	13	1
(Sweden) Tom Pettersson	8	1

Name	Yellow card	Yellow card Red card	Red card
(Brazil) Álberis da Silva	2	0	1
(Sweden) Anton Tinnerholm	2	1	0
(Sweden) Daniel Hallingström	3	0	0
(Brazil) Marinho	2	0	0
(Sweden) Magnus Eriksson	2	0	0
(Cameroon) Alain Junior Ollé Ollé	2	0	0
(Sweden) Kristian Bergström	2	0	0
(Denmark) Allan Arenfeldt Olesen	2	0	0
(Sweden) Tobias Nilsson	1	0	0

= Number of bookings
= Number of sending offs after a second yellow card
= Number of sending offs by a direct red card

=== Svenska cupen ===
19 August 2012 Round 2	Skövde AIK	0 – 3	Åtvidabergs FF	Skövde
17:00	Adam Rosén (yellow card) 41'	Summary	Möller 9'; Prodell 37', 39'	Stadium: Södermalms IP; Attendance: 590; Referee: Anti Kanerva
