= Adelswärd =

Adelswärd may refer to:

- Adelswärd (baronial family), Swedish family descended from the Hultman line of the extinct titled family Adelswärd
- Adelswärd (comital family), descended from the baronial family Adelswärd
- Adelswärd (noble family), Swedish family which consists of two lines, related through female line
- Jacques d'Adelswärd-Fersen (1880–1923), French novelist and poet
