= List of foreign Superettan players =

This is a list of foreign players in Superettan, which commenced play in 2000. The following players must meet both of the following two criteria:

1. have played at least one Superettan game. Players who were signed by Superettan clubs, but only played in lower league, cup and/or European games, or did not play in any competitive games at all, are not included.
2. are considered foreign, determined by the following:

A player is considered foreign if he is not eligible to play for Sweden men's national football team. (Note: More specifically, If a player has been capped on international level, the national team is used; if he has been capped by more than one country, the highest level (or the most recent) team is used.; If a player has not been capped on international level, his country of birth is used, except those who were born abroad from Swedish parents or moved to Sweden at a young age, and those who clearly indicated to have switched his nationality to another nation.; Clubs listed are those which the player has played at least one Superettan game for.)

== List of players ==
=== Afghanistan ===
- Norlla Amiri – Trelleborg – 2016–2017

=== Armenia ===
- Levon Pachajyan – Assyriska – 2013–2014

=== Bosnia and Herzegovina ===
- Admir Aganović – Assyriska – 2013–
- Dragan Kapčević – Brage, Husqvarna – 2012–
- Aleksandar Kitić – Ljungskile – 2005–2007, 2009–

=== Brazil ===
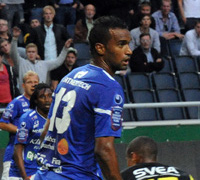
Álberis da Silva has played 35 Superettan matches for Åtvidaberg.

- Daniel Bamberg – Norrköping – 2006–2007, 2009–2010
- Diego Brum – Syrianska – 2014, 2018
- Wílton Figueiredo – GAIS – 2005
- Genalvo – Ljungskile – 2009–2012
- Willian Gerlem – Syrianska – 2014
- Paulinho Guará – Hammarby – 2011
- Bruno Manoel Marinho – Åtvidaberg – 2008–2009, 2011
- Caio Mendes – Norrköping, Brage, GAIS – 2010, 2012
- Daniel Mendes – Kalmar, Degerfors, GAIS – 2003, 2006, 2013
- Paulinho – Häcken – 2007–2008
- Rafael Porcellis – Värnamo – 2011
- Álvaro Santos – Örgryte – 2010
- Bruno Santos – Norrköping, Ljungskile – 2004–2007, 2010–2012
- Igor Santos Koppe – Syrianska – 2014–2015, 2016
- Ricardo Santos – Åtvidaberg, Jönköpings Södra – 2008–2009
- Álberis da Silva – Åtvidaberg – 2009, 2011
- Danilo de Souza – Assyriska – 2011–2014

=== Cameroon ===
- Hervé Tchami – Värnamo – 2014

=== Canada ===
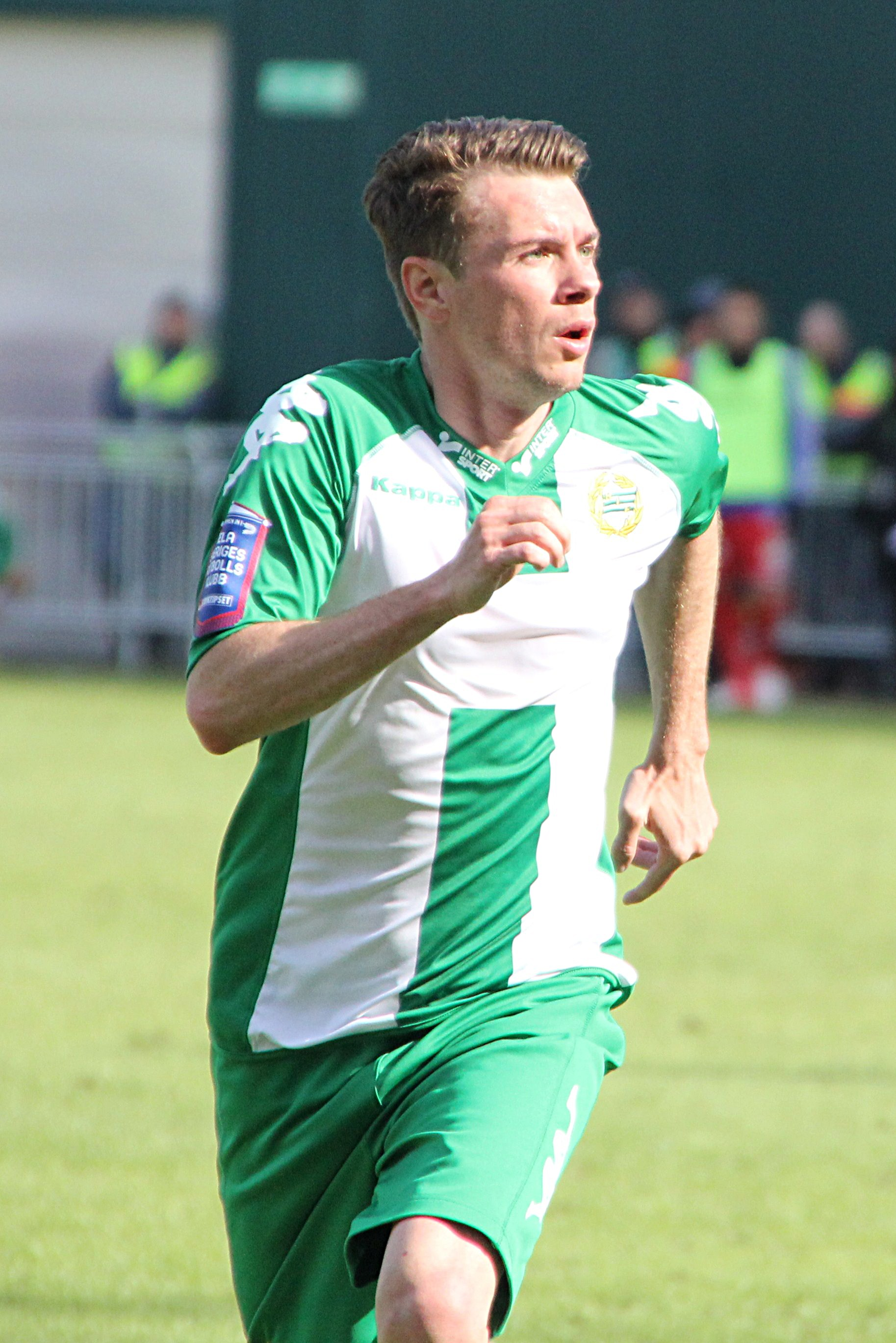
Nikolas Ledgerwood has played 36 Superettan matches for Hammarby.

- Nikolas Ledgerwood – Hammarby – 2012–2013

=== Chile ===
- Diego Olate – Husqvarna – 2014–
- Juan Robledo – Mjällby, Värnamo – 2008–2009, 2014–
- Carlos Ross – Husqvarna – 2014–

=== Comoros ===
- Fouad Bachirou – Östersund – 2014–15

=== DR Congo ===
- Richard Ekunde – Åtvidaberg, GAIS – 2003–2005, 2014–

=== Croatia ===
- Luka Perić – Östersund – 2014–

=== Czech Republic ===
- Pavel Zavadil – Mjällby, Öster, Örgryte – 2005, 2007–2008, 2010

=== Denmark ===
- Thomas Guldborg Christensen – Hammarby – 2012–
- Anders Nielsen – Husqvarna – 2014–
- Niclas Rønne – Landskrona – 2014–
- Cheikh Sarr – Hammarby, Landskrona – 2011, 2014–

=== Dominican Republic ===
- Riki Alba – Varberg – 2016

=== El Salvador ===
- Dustin Corea – Jönköpings Södra – 2012

=== England ===
- James Baldwin – Östersund – 2014–
- Dominic Furness – Ljungskile – 2014–
- Jamie Hopcutt – Östersund – 2013–
- Taylor Morgan – Östersund – 2013–
- Connor Ripley – Östersund – 2014–
- James Sinclair – Ljungskile – 2013–

=== Equatorial Guinea ===
- Marvin Anieboh – Utsiktens BK – 2022

=== Estonia ===
- Martin Vunk – Syrianska – 2010

=== Ethiopia ===
- Yussuf Saleh – Syrianska – 2010, 2014–

=== Faroe Islands ===
- Finnur Justinussen – Jönköpings Södra – 2012

=== Finland ===
- Magnus Bahne – Assyriska – 2011
- Fredrik Nordback – Örebro – 2005–2006
- Jukka Sauso – Örgryte, Jönköpings Södra – 2007, 2010–2011
- Henri Scheweleff – Örgryte – 2007
- Fredrik Svanbäck – Landskrona – 2010–2013

=== Gambia ===
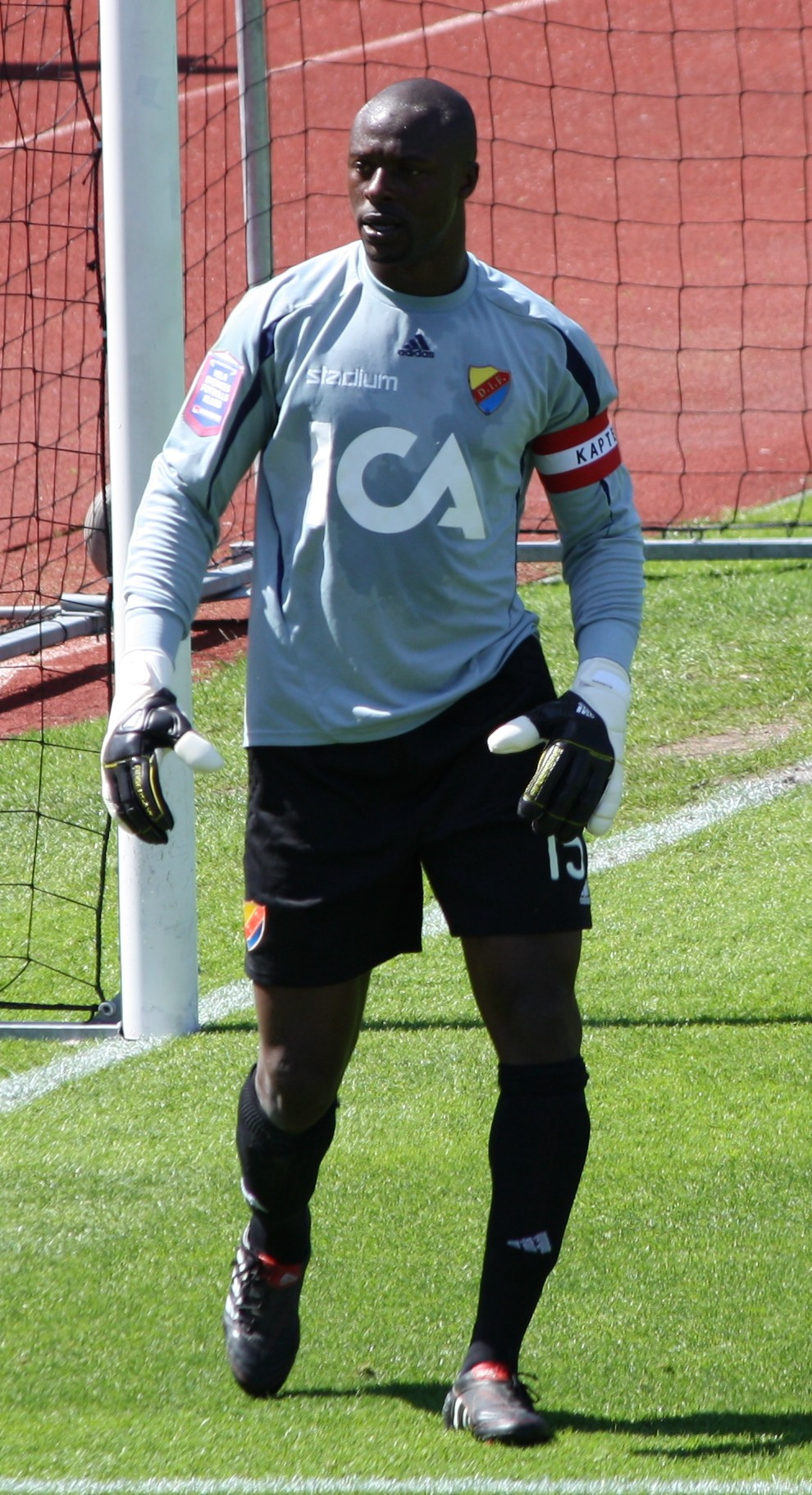
Pa Dembo Touray has played 60 Superettan matches for Djurgården and Assyriska.

- Kebba Ceesay – Dalkurd – 2017–
- Mohamed Mbye – Assyriska – 2009–2013
- Aziz Corr Nyang – Åtvidaberg, Assyriska, GIF Sundsvall, Brommapojkarna – 2004, 2008–2012
- Alagie Sosseh – Landskrona, Väsby United – 2009–2010
- Pa Dembo Touray – Djurgården, Assyriska – 2000–2002

=== Germany ===
- Orhan Aktas – Husqvarna – 2014–

=== Ghana ===
- Thomas Boakye – Östersund – 2013–
- Derek Boateng – AIK – 2005
- Benjamin Fadi – Värnamo – 2014–

=== Guinea-Bissau ===
- José Monteiro de Macedo – Hammarby – 2010–2012

=== Iceland ===
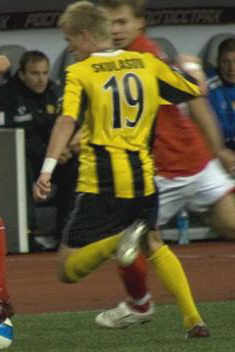
Ari Freyr Skúlason has played 120 Superettan matches for Häcken and GIF Sundsvall.

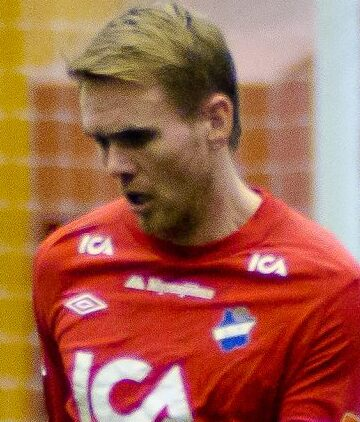
Davíð Viðarsson has played 72 Superettan matches for Öster.

- Ásgeir Börkur Ásgeirsson – GAIS – 2014–
- Jón Guðni Fjóluson – GIF Sundsvall – 2013–
- Garðar Gunnlaugsson – Norrköping – 2006–2007
- Hannes Þorsteinn Sigurðsson – GIF Sundsvall – 2009–2010
- Rúnar Már Sigurjónsson – GIF Sundsvall – 2013–
- Ari Freyr Skúlason – Häcken, GIF Sundsvall – 2007, 2009–2013
- Steinþór Freyr Þorsteinsson – Örgryte – 2010
- Davíð Viðarsson – Öster – 2010–2012

=== Iran ===
- Arash Talebinejad – Västra Frölunda, AIK, Brommapojkarna – 2001–2002, 2005, 2008
- Arash Bayat – Västra Frölunda, Sundsvall, Qviding, Ljungskile – 2001–2005, 2006–2007, 2009, 2010
- Ali Mohammadian – Trollhättan – 2009–2010
- Koyar Salimi – Västerås – 2011
- Omid Nazari – Ängelholm – 2011–2014
- Amin Nazari – Assyriska, Falkenberg – 2013, 2017
- William Atashkadeh – Örebro, Örgryte – 2013, 2016–2018
- Saman Ghoddos – Syrianska – 2014–2015
- Karvan Ahmadi – Sirius – 2015
- Navid Nasseri – Syrianska – 2017–2018
- Arvin Shojaee – GAIS – 2017

=== Iraq ===
- Brwa Nouri – Åtvidaberg, Eskilstuna, Östersund – 2006, 2008, 2014–2015

=== Jamaica ===
- Dwayne Miller – Syrianska – 2010

=== Kosovo ===
- Shpetim Hasani – Degerfors IF, IK Sirius, Örebro SK, Degerfors IF – 2005; 2006–2008, 2009, 2012–2014, 2016–2017
- Leonard Pllana – Dalkurd FF, Norrby IF, GAIS, IK Brage – 2016–2018, 2017, 2018–2019, 2020–2021
- Erion Sadiku – Varbergs BoIS, Örgryte, Varbergs BoIS – 2017–2021, 2022–2024, 2024–
- Edi Sylisufaj – Falkenberg, Örgryte, Landskrona BoIS – 2016–2022, 2023–2024, 2024–
- Dardan Rexhepi – GAIS, Norrby IF – 2016–2017, 2019–2020
- Anel Rashkaj – AFC Eskilstuna, Örgryte – 2018–2019, 2021–2022
- Jetmir Haliti – Landskrona BoIS, Jönköpings Södra IF – 2018, 2019–2021
- Xhevdet Llumnica – Assyriska FF – 2007–2010
- Ismet Lushaku – AFC Eskilstuna – 2019–2021
- Erton Fejzullahu – Mjällby AIF – 2007, 2008–2009
- Bajram Ajeti – Gefle IF, AFC Eskilstuna, Umeå FC – 2017, 2018, 2020
- Ilir Berisha – Örebro SK, Västerås SK – 2013, 2019
- Astrit Selmani – Ängelholms FF, Varbergs BoIS – 2016, 2019
- Albert Krasniqi – Vasalund IF – 2009
- Loret Sadiku – IFK Värnamo – 2009–2011
- Aulon Bitiqi – Varbergs BoIS – 2024–
- Patriot Sejdiu – Dalkurd FF – 2020
- Korab Gashi – Falkenberg, Varbergs BoIS – 2008–2010, 2012
- Liridon Leci – Landskrona BoIS – 2013
- Guri Baqaj – IF Limhamn Bunkeflo – 2008
- Dion Krasniqi – Sandvikens IF – 2025

=== Liberia ===
- Isaac Pupo – Hammarby – 2011
- Amadaiya Rennie – Degerfors, Hammarby – 2011–

=== Mexico ===
- Éder López Carreras – Östersund – 2013–
- Alexis Mendiola – GIF Sundsvall, Östersund – 2011, 2013–

=== Moldova ===
- Gheorghe Andronic – Värnamo, Degerfors – 2011–2012

=== Montenegro ===
- Semir Agović – Husqvarna – 2014
- Zoran Aković – Husqvarna – 2014
- Uroš Delić – Syrianska – 2014

=== Montserrat ===
- Alex Dyer – Östersund – 2014–

=== Netherlands ===
- Othman El Kabir – Ängelholm – 2013–2014
- Michael Timisela – Hammarby – 2013–2014

=== New Zealand ===
- Steven Old – Ljungskile – 2014–
- Jarrod Smith – Ljungskile – 2011

=== Nigeria ===
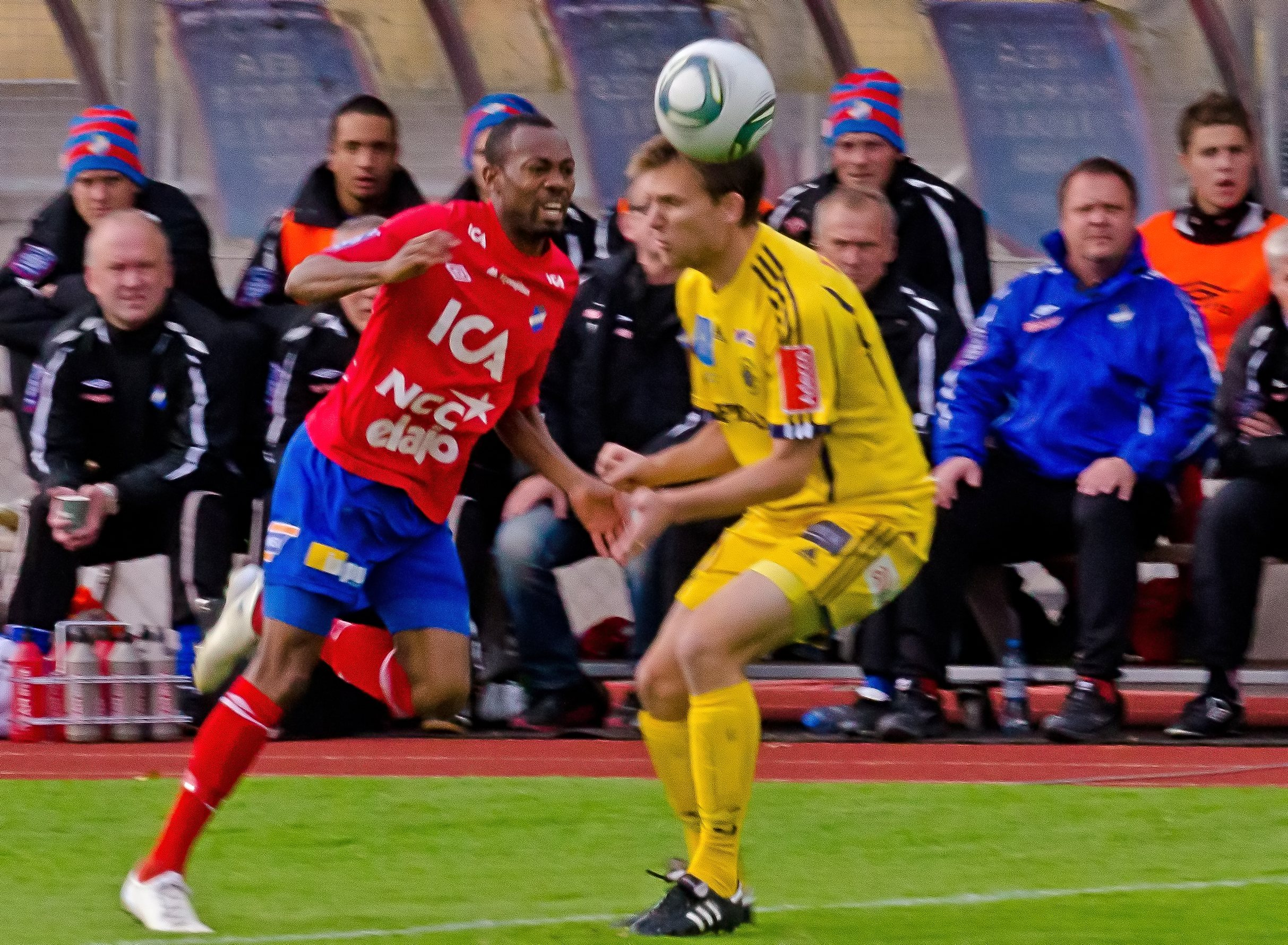
Kevin Amuneke has played 24 Superettan matches for Öster.

- Oke Akpoveta – Frej, Dalkurd, Helsingborg – 2016–
- Kevin Amuneke – Öster – 2011–2012
- Alhaji Gero – Öster – 2014–
- Peter Ijeh – Syrianska – 2010
- Paul Obiefule – Assyriska – 2013
- Moses Ogbu – Sirius – 2014–
- Nsima Peter – Varberg – 2013–
- Monday Samuel – Ängelholm – 2012–

=== Northern Ireland ===
- Daryl Smylie – Jönköpings Södra – 2009–

=== Norway ===
- Christian Brink – GIF Sundsvall – 2009–2011
- Eirik Dybendal – Häcken, Norrköping – 2003–2004, 2006–2010
- Dinko Felić – Syrianska – 2009–2010, 2014–
- Lars Fuhre – Hammarby – 2014–
- Petter Furuseth – Assyriska, Hammarby – 2009–2011
- Roger Risholt – Häcken, GIF Sundsvall – 2007, 2011
- Lars Sætra – Hammarby – 2014–
- Jan Gunnar Solli – Hammarby – 2014–
- Fredrik Torsteinbø – Hammarby – 2014–

=== Palestine ===
- Imad Zatara – Syrianska – 2009–2010
- Ahmed Awad – IFK Värnamo, Dalkurd – 2013, 2016–

=== Poland ===
- Marcin Burkhardt – Norrköping – 2009
- Jakub Ojrzyński – Utsiktens – 2025–
- Michał Pawlik – Västerås – 2022
- Zeyn S-Latef – Ängelholm – 2012–2016

=== Rwanda ===
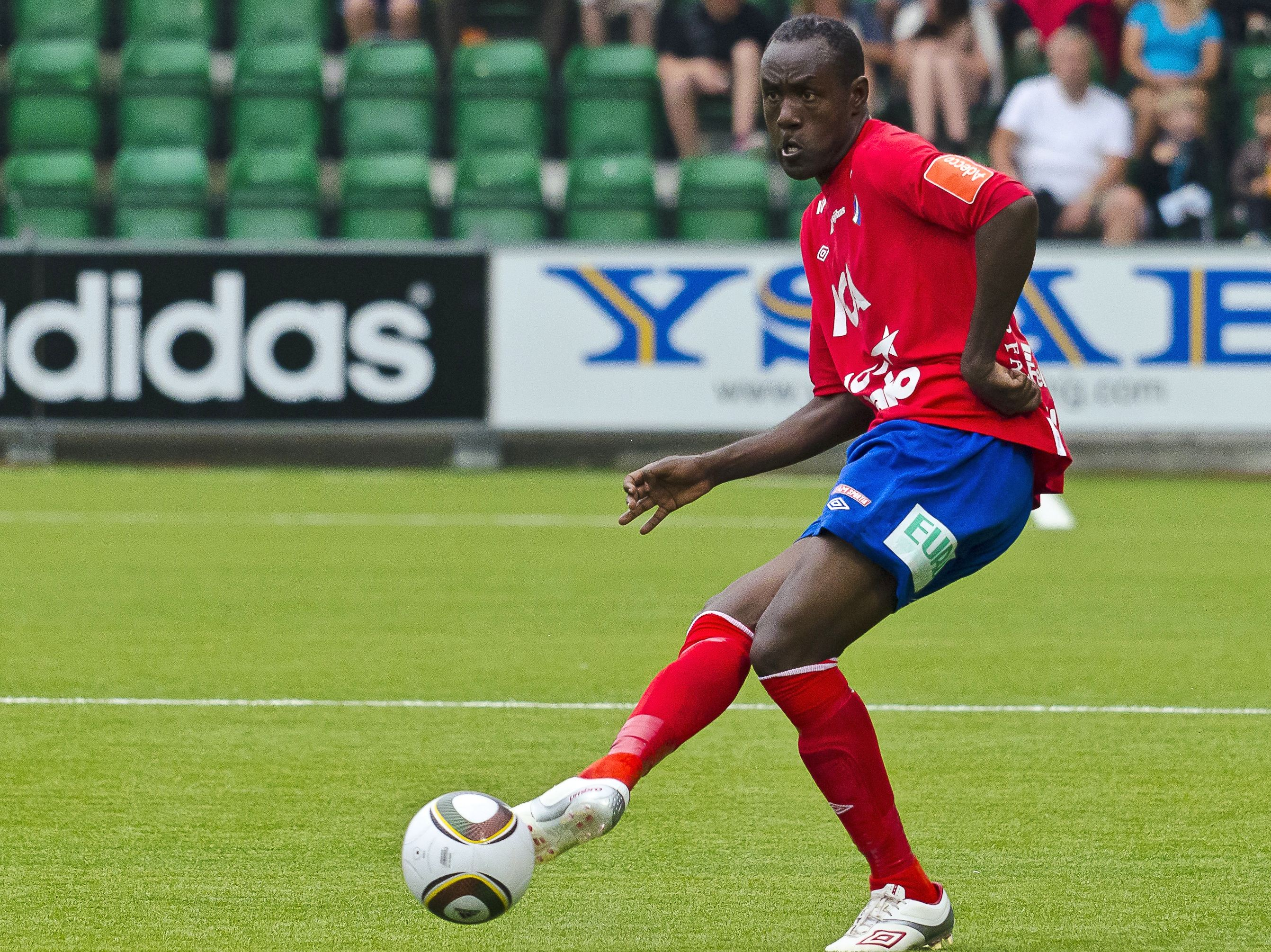
Olivier Karekezi has played 49 Superettan matches for Öster.

- Olivier Karekezi – Öster – 2010–2011

=== Serbia ===
- Nikola Grubješić – Syrianska – 2014–
- Marko Mihajlović – Umeå, Brage, Hammarby – 2012–

=== Sierra Leone ===
- Mohamed Bangura – Dalkurd – 2017–
- Samuel Barlay – Örgryte – 2007
- Alhaji Kamara – Värnamo – 2013
- Ibrahim Koroma – Trelleborg, Varberg – 2012–
- Sheriff Suma – Åtvidaberg, Jönköping – 2005–2006, 2010–2011
- Donald Wellington – Värnamo – 2011

=== Slovakia ===
- Tomáš Peciar – Östersund – 2014–

=== South Africa ===
- Amethyst Bradley Ralani – Landskrona – 2010–
- Jabu Mahlangu Pule – Öster – 2010

=== South Korea ===
- Moon Seon-min – Östersund – 2012–

=== Syria ===
- Louay Chanko – Syrianska – 2014–2017
- Imad Chhadeh – Åtvidaberg, Brommapojkarna, Assyriska – 2002–2006, 2008, 2011
- Elias Merkes – Assyriska – 2006, 2008, 2010

=== Turkey ===
- Isa Bagci
- Ceyhun Eriş – Assyriska – 2010, 2012

=== Ukraine ===
- Vyacheslav Jevtushenko – Brage – 2010–2012

=== United States ===
- Alex De John – Dalkurd – 2017–2018
- Patrick Hopkins – Ljungskile, Sirius – 2012–2013, 2014–2016
- Alex Horwath – Ljungskile – 2014
- Aaron Nichols – Ljungskile – 2013–2015
- Brandon McDonald – Ljungskile – 2014
- Eric Pothast – Ängelholm – 2014–2015
- Matt Pyzdrowski – Ängelholm, Helsingborg, Varberg – 2011–2014, 2017, 2018
- Andrew Stadler – Landskrona, Östersund, Dalkurd, Syrianska – 2014, 2015, 2017, 2019
- Paul Torres – Landskrona, Sirius, Assyriska, Syrianska – 2014, 2016, 2019
- Bobby Warshaw – Ängelholm, GAIS – 2013, 2014

=== Zambia ===
- Boyd Mwila – Örgryte, Trollhättan – 2007–2008, 2010
- Edwin Phiri – Ljungskile – 2006–2007, 2009–2010

== Notes ==
1. Born in France
2. Born in Norway
3. Born in Spain
4. Born in Sweden
5. Capped for the Sweden men's national football team

== See also ==
- List of Superettan players
- List of foreign Allsvenskan players
