= Marcus Haglind-Sangré =

Swedish footballer (born 1995)

Personal information
- Full name: Gustav Marcus Haglind-Sangré
- Date of birth: 4 February 1995 (age 31)
- Place of birth: Linköping, Sweden
- Height: 1.90 m (6 ft 3 in)
- Position: Defender

Team information
- Current team: Wisła Płock
- Number: 4

Youth career
- Linköping
- 2010: BK Derby
- 2012–2013: Malmö

Senior career*
| Years | Team | Apps | (Gls) |
| 2011 | FK Linköping | 18 | (3) |
| 2014–2015 | Motala | 41 | (2) |
| 2016 | Oddevold | 23 | (3) |
| 2017–2020 | Akropolis | 108 | (7) |
| 2021–2023 | Örgryte | 87 | (6) |
| 2024– | Wisła Płock | 82 | (4) |

International career
| 2011–2012 | Sweden U17 | 13 | (1) |
| 2013 | Sweden U19 | 7 | (0) |
- * Club domestic league appearances and goals as of 18:00, 29 May 2026 (UTC)

Gustav Marcus Haglind-Sangré (born 4 February 1995) is a Swedish professional footballer who plays as a defender for Polish club Wisła Płock.

== Club career ==
He started his childhood career in Linköping. He played for BK Derby when being selected for the Swedish under-15 team in 2010. He subsequently featured for the youth national team in 2011, 2012 and 2023.

In 2011, he played 18 league matches and two cup matches for fifth-tier team FK Linköping. After being on trial at the Liverpool's academy, he was offered contracts by clubs including Malmö and Åtvidaberg, opting for the former. He played as a central midfielder at the time, and was envisioned advancement from U19 to U21 within the contract span, with additional prospects of reaching the senior team in 2015. In 2014 he left Malmö and continued his senior career at Motala AIF on the third tier.

With subsequent spells in Oddevold and Akropolis, Haglind-Sangré made his Superettan debut in the 2020 opener against Dalkurd. He featured in all 30 league games that season. Now a central defender, he was recruited by Örgryte in 2021. After ÖIS narrowly avoided relegation from both the 2022 and 2023 Superettan, Haglind-Sangré moved on to Wisła Płock in January 2024.

== Personal life ==
Haglind-Sangré is a keen hiker. He has previously worked with former Olympic pole vaulter Alhaji Jeng, who served as an advisor providing Haglind-Sangré with physical and mental coaching.
