= I Used to Be a Sparrow =

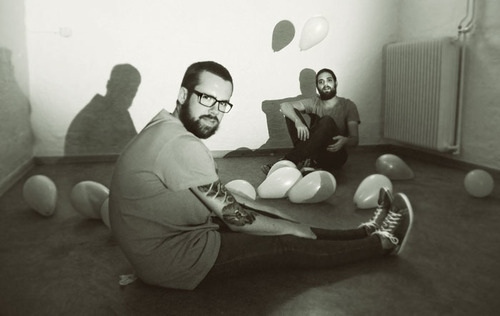
- The duo of Dick Pettersson and Andrea Caccese, known as I Used To Be A Sparrow.

Background information
- Origin: Västerås, Sweden
- Genres: Indie, alternative rock
- Years active: 2011–present
- Labels: Paper Wings, Thistime
- Members: Andrea Caccese; Dick Pettersson

I Used to Be a Sparrow is an alternative rock band based in Västerås, Sweden. The act mainly consists of Andrea Caccese and Dick Pettersson, and has so far released two studio albums, the second of which is entitled "You Are An Empty Artist.

== Album history ==
Pettersson, who had worked in the band "In These Woods", and Caccese, who was performing under the name "Songs for the Sleepwalkers", met at a local concert venue in late 2011. The pair began working together, producing and distributing their debut album Luke under Caccese's imprint, Paper Wings Music.

Luke was released in March 2012. The album contains eleven songs and it includes influences from several genres of music. The release of the single "Life is Good" led to the album being reviewed by a number of independent music blogs and online publications, as well as featured on Sveriges Radio and MTV Italy. Mainly positive reception led to re-issues over the spring 2012, including a British edition under Special Blend Records, a version for the Japanese market under Thistime Records, and a feature on Sound Supp.ly's drop 4.

I Used To Be A Sparrow went on a summer European tour in support of the album, performing in Germany, Italy, Sweden, Slovakia, Czech Republic and Belgium. The band performed at the 2012 Neapolis Festival in Italy. and was one of several emerging bands providing music at the Giffon Film Festival.

Later that year the group released a single entitled "Warpaint On Invisible Children" on UK magazine Clash Music. A full album streaming of their second album, You are an Empty Artist, was then released on Italian independent music magazine Freak Out. A cassette version of the album was also released by Jeremy Records.

In 2013, the band collaborated with the Italian band Fabryka to record the album "Echo".

== Band members ==
- Dick Pettersson – vocals, guitar & keys
- Andrea Caccese – vocals, guitar & keys

Other musicians and usual collaborators

- Nicklas Sandström – guitar, drums & multi-instrumentalist
- Erik Moberg – bass, drums & multi-instrumentalist
- Adam Mellesmo – drums
- Maria Schweitz – vocals

== Discography ==
Studio albums

- Luke (2012)
- You are an Empty Artist (2013)
