= Kyle Knotek =

American soccer player

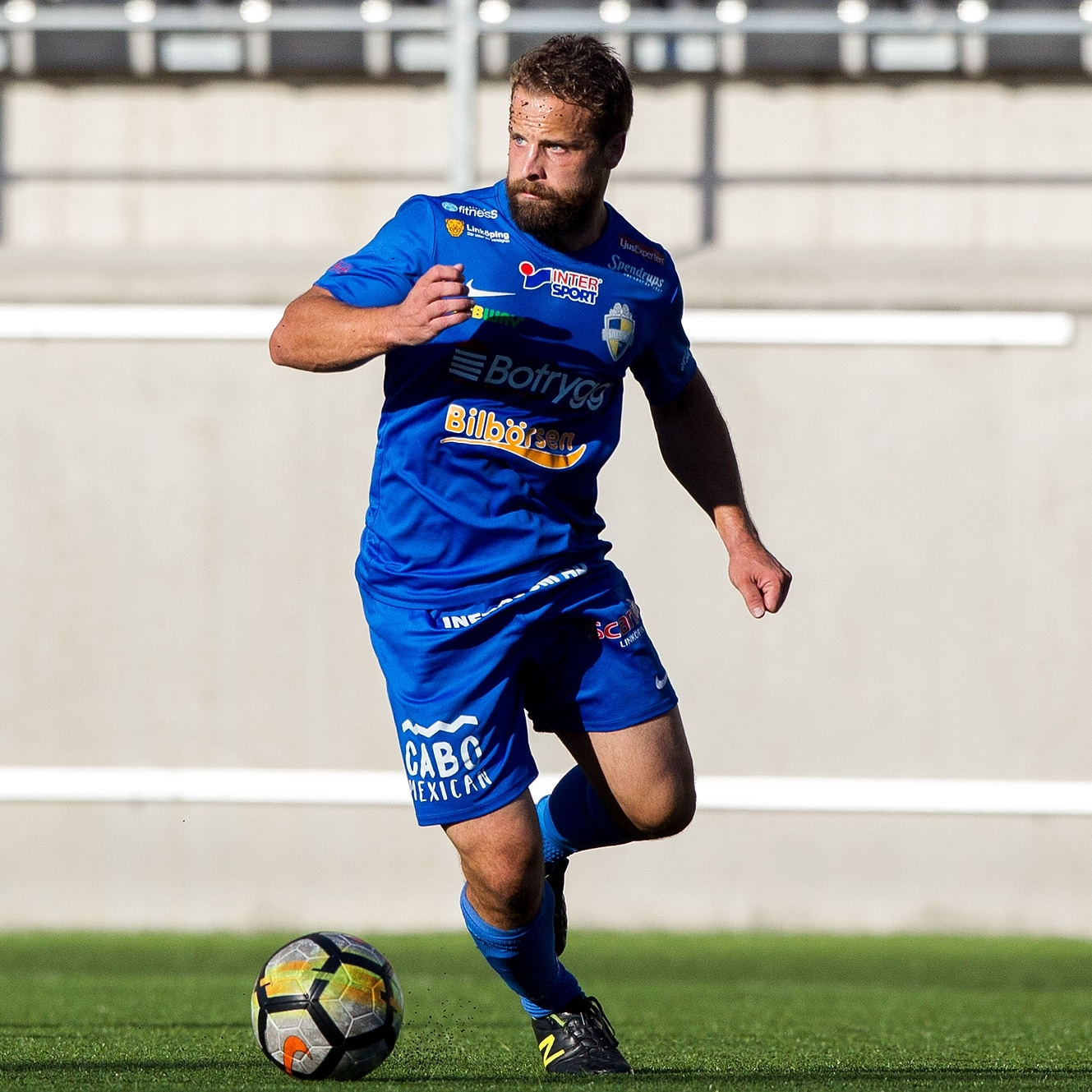

Personal information
- Full name: Kyle Knotek
- Date of birth: February 19, 1988 (age 38)
- Place of birth: Arlington Heights, Illinois, United States
- Height: 5 ft 6 in (1.68 m)
- Positions: Midfielder; winger

Youth career
- 2006–2010: NIU Huskies

Senior career*
| Years | Team | Apps | (Gls) |
| 2007–2010 | Chicago Fire Premier | 29 | (0) |
| 2012–2014 | Dayton Dutch Lions | 21 | (0) |
| 2014 | PS Kemi Kings | 7 | (0) |
| 2015 | Kraft Närpes | 17 | (0) |
| 2016–2018 | Linköping City | 43 | (2) |
| 2018–2019 | Fluminense Šamorín | 15 | (0) |
- * Club domestic league appearances and goals as of 8 January 2020

Kyle Knotek (born February 19, 1988, in Geneva, Illinois) is a former professional football (soccer) player who most recently played for Fluminense Šamorín in Slovakia.

== Youth Soccer ==
=== Club ===
Knotek started with many smaller local clubs eventually landing at Campton United where he played for 2–3 years. When the team he played with split up, Knotek transferred to Chicago Magic 1987/1988. During his time there, the club managed to win 5 States Cup titles and 3 Midwest Regional titles; His magic team also made it to the national final two times losing to the Dallas Texans Soccer Club both times.

Knotek was also involved in the Olympic Development Program where he was selected to the state team and regional team three times including international trips to Italy and Costa Rica.

=== College ===
Knotek attended Northern Illinois University reuniting with former Campton teammate, Louie Mojica. Throughout his career at NIU, Knotek played various positions including outside back, outside midfield and center midfield. He started nearly every game he played in at NIU including the Huskies 2006 Mid-American Conference title game against University of Akron when he was a freshman; Knotek also played in the Huskies win over the Loyola Ramblers in the NCAA Division 1 Tournament First Round and their loss to the Indiana Hoosiers in the Second Round.

Knotek had a fairly successful career both on and off the field where he was selected as an ESPN The Magazine Academic All-America Men's Soccer Second Team member in 2008 and then later selected as an ESPN The Magazine Academic All-America Men's Soccer First Team member in 2010.

Knotek spent the majority of his college summers playing for the Chicago Fire Premier. During his time there, the organization was successful highlighted by the Premier's appearance in the 2009 PDL National Championship in which he started.

== Professional career ==
=== F.C. Gifu (Japan) ===
After finishing his college career, Knotek was selected to attend the United Soccer League's 2011 combine. His performance earned him a trial with F.C. Gifu in the J. League Division 2. After a month on trial, Knotek chose to leave due to the escalating Fukushima Daiichi nuclear disaster that occurred while he was on trial.

=== Dayton Dutch Lions (USA) ===
Later in 2011, Knotek was selected by the Dayton Dutch Lions as the #10 for upcoming 2012 United Soccer League season. In 2012, the Dutch Lions did not have much success in the United Soccer League, but they did manage quarter final run 2012 Lamar Hunt U.S. Open Cup before eventually losing to the eventual champions Sporting Kansas City. During this year Knotek was honored as part of the United Soccer League's team of the week on May 15 and July 24 in addition to one honorable mention on May 22. Knotek re-signed for the Dutch Lions in 2013, but, after starting the first two games, his season was ended short by an injury.

=== Bridges FC (USA) / Palloseura Kemi Kings (Finland) ===
After a full recovery, Knotek trained with The Dayton Dutch Lions followed by the renowned Chicago program, Bridges FC; a program that helps showcase players to eventually sign in Europe. During the second transfer window, Knotek signed with the Palloseura Kemi Kings, who were at the top of the table in the Kakkonen Pohjoinen (Northern). The Palloseura Kemi Kings went on to win the league and also win their promotion playoff into the Ykkönen.

=== Närpes Kraft Fotbollsförening (Finland) ===
After a successful trial, Knotek was signed, at the time, as the only Non-European Union player for Närpes Kraft Fotbollsförening. He signed as a central midfielder, but spent time on the outside and at wingback as well. Knotek earned individual prizes for his performances both at home and on the road; all in different positions.

=== Bridges FC (USA) / FC Linköping City (Sweden) ===
After declining offers/trials overseas for various reasons, Knotek spent the first half of the season training with the FC Bridges team/program located in Chicago; while at FC Bridges, Knotek also played numerous friendlies against United Soccer League teams during this period. During the FC Bridges annual trip to Europe, Knotek left before the scouting period in Sweden to accept a trial with FC Linköping City where he was offered a contract after attending their mid-season training camp and performing well in his test game. Once the paperwork was cleared, Knotek started every game relevant to promotion for FC Linköping City. He played primarily as a holding center midfielder in their 4-2-3-1, but also logged minutes as winger; Knotek logged the second most minutes of any FC Linköping City field player during his time there in 2016. FC Linköping City was very successful when Knotek played with a record of 9–2–2 including a couple draws in the promotional qualification phase that ended up knocking them out on points.

=== 2017 FC Linköping City (Sweden) ===
Knotek returned to FC Linköping City in an effort to help the team promote to Division 1 in 2017. He signed as both a holding midfielder (#6) and a box to box midfielder (#8) with the ability to play as a winger (as he did for a couple games in his first spell with FC Linköping City.) He started the season as a box to box midfielder and scored the team's first goal of the season in their home opener, but was then moved back to #6 (holding central midfielder) to help solidify a defense recording the fewest goals in the league.

It was a prosperous season for both FC Linköping City and Knotek; FC Linköping City winning the league and earning promotion with a record of 21 wins, 4 draws, and 1 loss while Knotek was 1 of only 3 players nominated after the season for Midfielder of the League.

=== 2018 FC Linköping City (Sweden) ===
Due to an injury picked up in off-season training, Knotek was forced to miss FC Linköping City's preseason. After regaining his form, Knotek returned to the squad and was a mainstay in the midfield playing in every match except two due to accumulated yellow cards and a red card suspension. Shortly after the mid-season break, Knotek was offered and accepted a contract from ŠTK Fluminense Šamorín in the Slovak 2. Liga.

=== 2018-2019 ŠTK Fluminense Šamorín (Slovakia) ===
Knotek arrived in Šamorín from Linköping City in early September missing the first 8 games of the 2018-2019 II. liga's season. He made his home debut playing the full 90 in a 6–0 win over Žilina B marking ŠTK Fluminense Šamorín's first clean sheet in the last 10 league matches and biggest win of the season.

== Team Accomplishments ==
2017 FC Linköping City

League Champions

Earned Promotion to 1st Division

2014 Palloseura Kemi Kings

League Champions

Earned Promotion

Chicago Fire Premier

2009 PDL Central Conference Champions

2009 PDL North American Finalist

Chicago Fire Super 20's

2007 North American Super-20 Runners-up (Epping, NH)

== Individual Accomplishments ==
- 2017 Midfielder of the Year Finalist - Division 2 Södra Svealand
- USL (USA Professional League) Team of the Week May 15, 2012
- USL (USA Professional League) Team of the Week July 24, 2012
- USL (USA Professional League) Team of the Week Honorable Mention May 22, 2012
