= Daniel Swärd =

Swedish footballer

Personal information
- Full name: Daniel Swärd
- Date of birth: 22 February 1990 (age 36)
- Place of birth: Ljungsbro, Sweden
- Height: 1.84 m (6 ft 1/2 in)
- Position: Forward

Team information
- Current team: FC Linköping City
- Number: 10

Youth career
- BK Ljungsbro
- –2008: Linköpings FF

Senior career*
Years	Team	Apps	(Gls)
2009–2011	Åtvidabergs FF	21	(2)
2012–2014	Motala AIF	24	(4)
2015–	FC Linköping City	12	(2)
- * Club domestic league appearances and goals as of 22:46, 21 June 2015 (UTC)

Daniel Swärd (also spelled Svärd, born 22 February 1990) is a Swedish footballer who plays as a forward for FC Linköping City.

Swärd was born in Ljungsbro, Sweden, and played youth football with local team BK Ljungsbro, and in the early teens he established himself in Linköpings FF before joining Åtvidabergs FF in Superettan in 2009.

In his first year with Åtvidabergs FF the team ended up in second place and earned promotion to Allsvenskan, the Swedish top tier. The spell in Allsvenskan lasted for one season, before the team got relegated back to Superettan, but before relegation Swärd earned his first cap in the Swedish top division.

Swärd stayed in Åtvidabergs FF for a total of three seasons, making 21 appearances and scoring two goals, before moving to Motala AIF in Division 2 (Swedish fourth tier) for the 2012 season. Before 2015 season, after three years in Motala AIF (last season in Division 1), Svärd made the decision to move back to Linköping and Division 2 to play for FC Linköping City in their ambition of becoming an elite team.

== Career statistics ==
As of match played 21 June 2015

Club	Season	League			National Cup		Total	
Club	Season	Division	Apps	Goals	Apps	Goals	Apps	Goals
Åtvidabergs FF	2009	Superettan	8	0	–		8	0
Åtvidabergs FF	2010	Allsvenskan	1	0	1	1	2	1
Åtvidabergs FF	2011	Superettan	12	2	3	1	15	3
Åtvidabergs FF	Total		21	2	4	2	25	4
Motala AIF	2012	Division 2 Ö Götaland	?	?	1	1	1	1
Motala AIF	2013	Division 2 S Svealand	?	?	–		0	0
Motala AIF	2014	Division 1 Södra	24	4	1	0	25	4
Motala AIF	Total		24	4	2	1	26	5
FC Linköping City	2015	Division 2	12	2	–		12	2
FC Linköping City	Total		12	2	–		12	2
Career total			57	8	6	3	63	11
