= Brunnsholm =

Estate and former seat farm

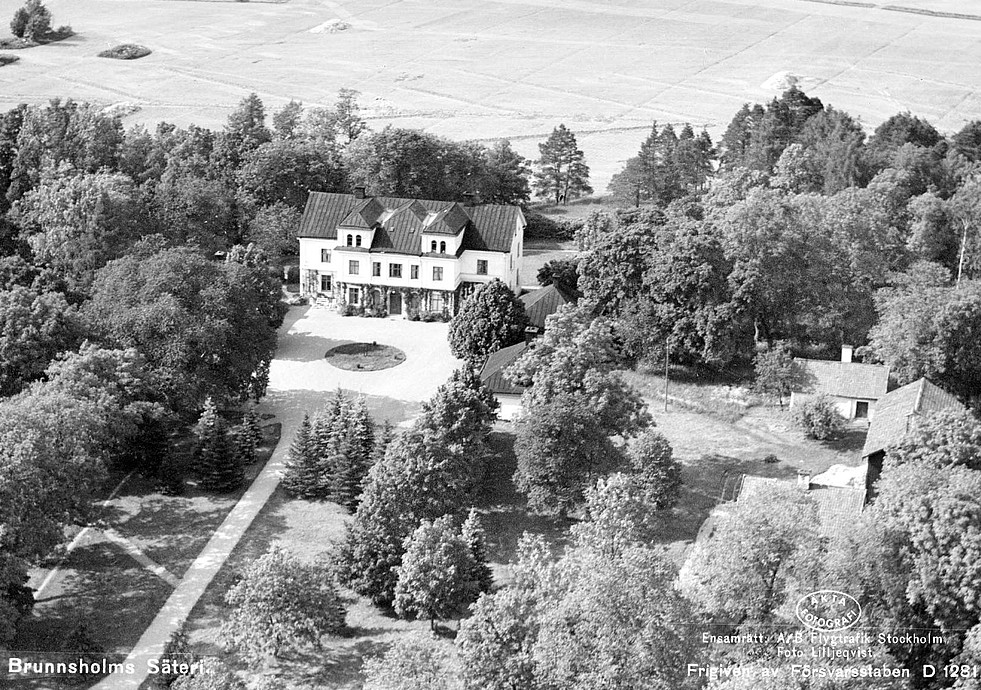
Brunnsholm Manor 1936.

Brunnsholm (also Brunsholm) is an estate and former seat farm in Enköpings-Näs parish in Enköping municipality in Uppland, Sweden, located 12 kilometers southwest of Enköping.

== History ==
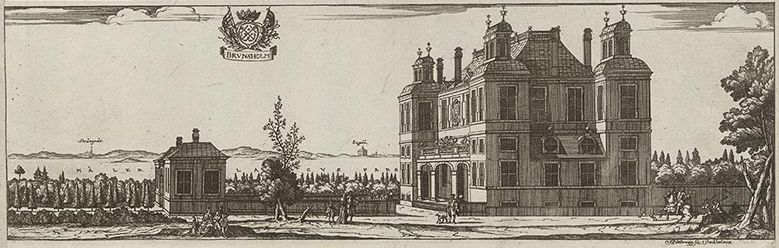
Brunsholm in Suecia Antiqua et Hodierna 1686.

In 1302 Brunnsholm was owned by the Riksdag Magnus Gregersson (Läma) and eventually it passed into the possession of the Lilje family. At the end of the 16th century, Brunnsholm was owned by Anna Stengafvel, married to the commander of Värmland, Rikskammerrad Schering Eriksson Arp.

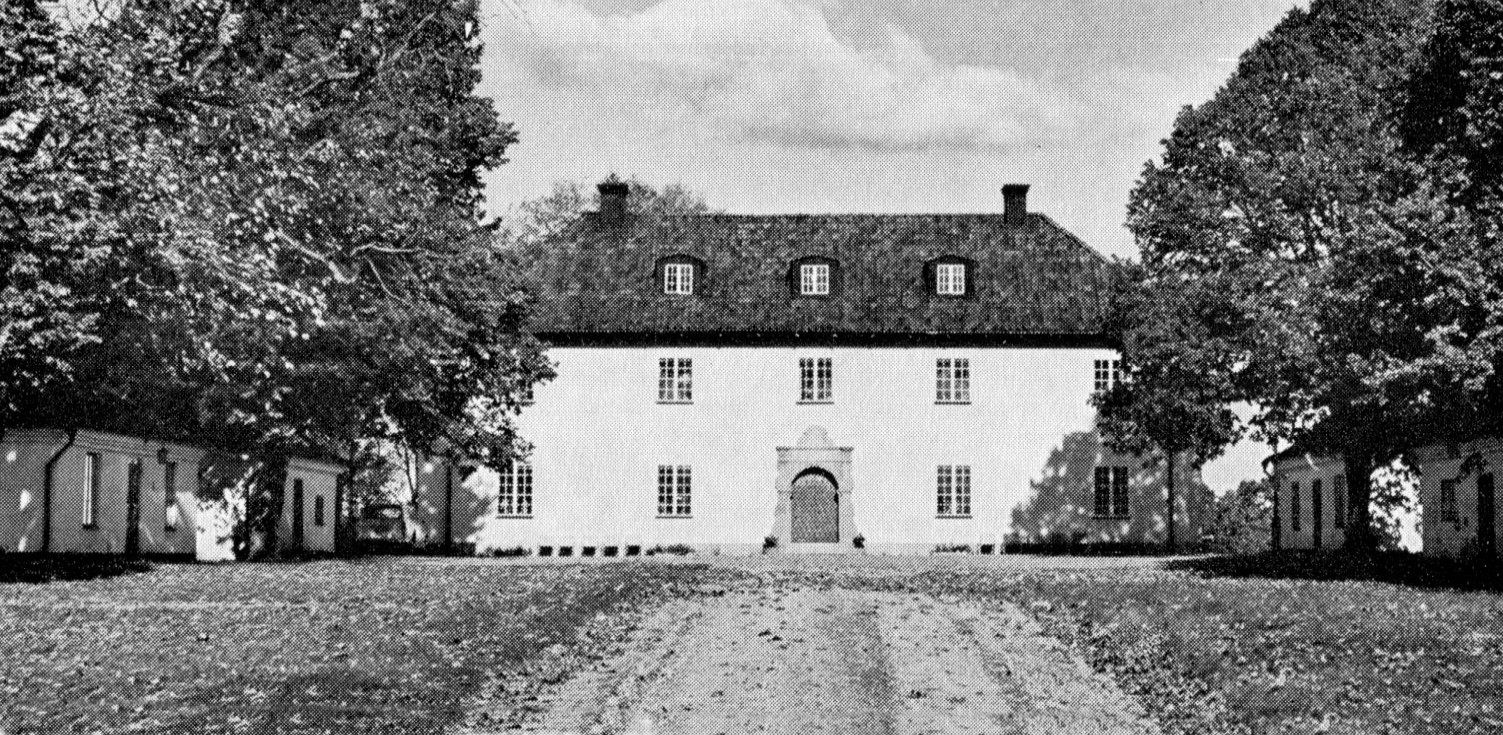
Main building and wings, 1968.

The farm was then inherited by their daughter Margareta, married to the assessor at the Svea Hovrätt Gorgonius Henriksson Gyllenankar in his third marriage. Gyllenankar died in 1628 and estate was inherited by their son, the governor Gabriel Gyllenankar, 1611–1657. He was married to his cousin, their mothers were sisters, Schering Rosenhane's sister-in-law, Maria Sparre af Rossvik, 1613–1657, daughter of the equestrian master, governor and governor Bengt Jöransson Sparre.

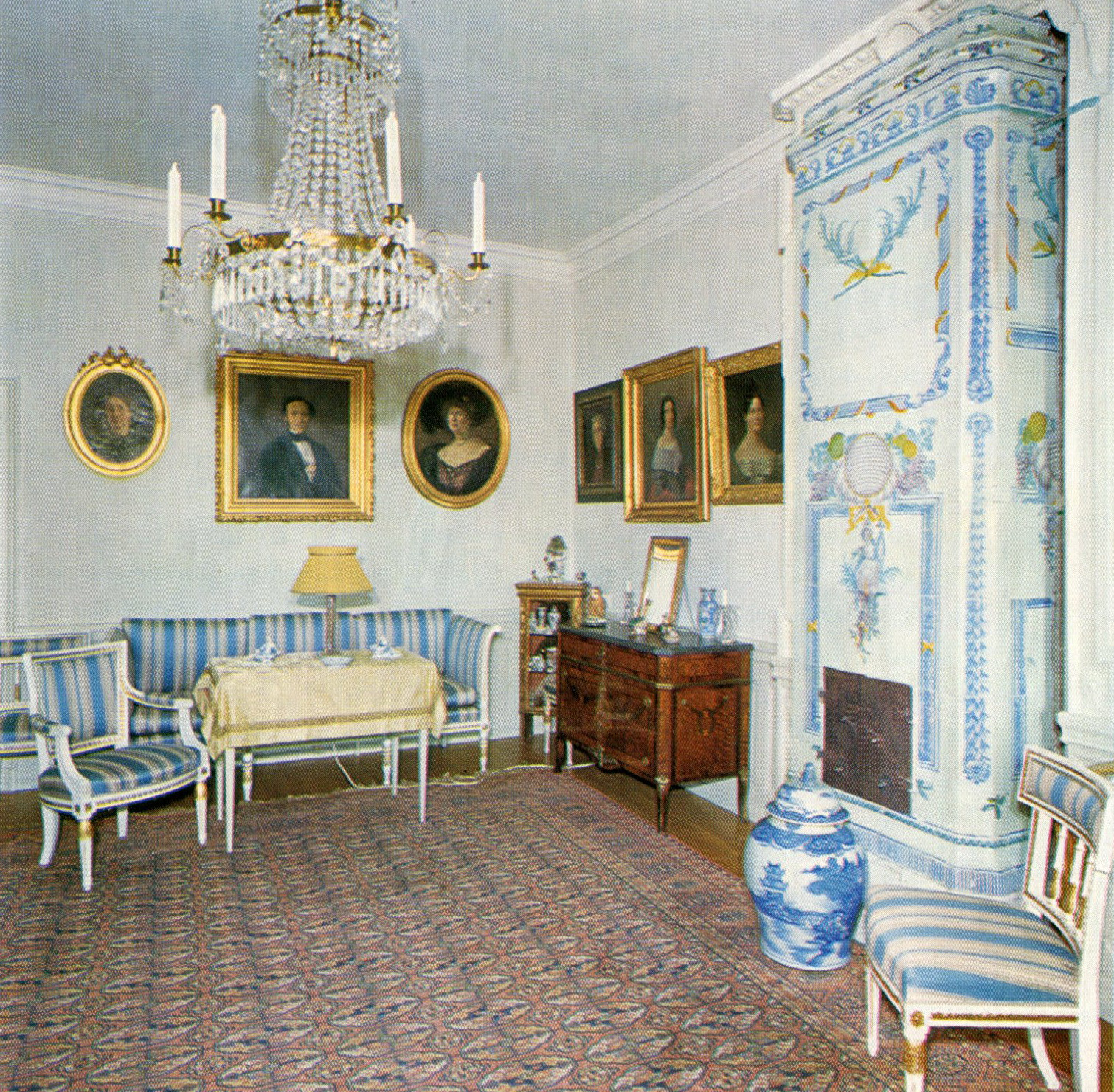
The salon with Gustavian decor.

The next owner was the son Bengt, 1646–1696. He became auscultant at Svea Hovrätt in 1670, assessor in 1674 and vice-president in 1695. He married in 1681 at Bergshammar in Fogdö parish in Södermanland to Christina Magdalena Sack, 1659–1732, daughter of the county governor Carl Filip Sack.

Their daughter Christina Maria inherited Brunnsholm from her parents. She married in 1711 the governor of Skaraborg County, Baron Peter von Danckwardt 1662–1732, in his second marriage. He was the owner of Normestorp in Slaka parish and Ulljeberg in Viby parish, both in Östergötland.

== Building ==
The main building is of stone in two stories with four wings. Brunnholm has belonged to the Lejon, Stengavel and Dohna families, and in the early 1800s to the Adelswärd family.

== Brunnsholm today ==
Brunnsholm is now owned by the Rinman family. The business, spread over three farms, is focused on cereal production (winter wheat, barley and oilseeds), slaughter pig and sheep production (Målhammar's farm) and production of rapeseed oil. The farm comprises 870 hectares of cultivated land.
