= Christoffer Karlsson =

Swedish footballer (born 1988)

Personal information
- Full name: Linus Christoffer Karlsson
- Date of birth: 27 January 1988 (age 38)
- Place of birth: Sweden
- Height: 1.79 m (5 ft 10 in)
- Position: Midfielder

Youth career
- Åtvidabergs FF

Senior career*
Years	Team	Apps	(Gls)
2004	Åtvidabergs FF	16	(0)
2005–2010	Djurgårdens IF	0	(0)
2005–2006	→ Åtvidabergs FF (loan)	49	(1)
2008–2009	→ Åtvidabergs FF (loan)	55	(1)
2010–2013	Åtvidabergs FF	52	(0)
2012	→ Varbergs BoIS (loan)	12	(0)
2013	Grebo IK	–	(–)
2014	FC Linköping City	21	(2)
2015–2017	Grebo IK	–	(–)
2018	Åtvidabergs FF	26	(1)

International career
2003–2005	Sweden U17	18	(1)
2005–2007	Sweden U19	11	(1)
- * Club domestic league appearances and goals as of 25 February 2019

Christoffer Karlsson (born 27 January 1988) is a Swedish footballer who most recently played as a midfielder for Åtvidabergs FF.

He was bought by Djurgårdens IF from Åtvidaberg at the start of the 2005 season, and was loaned out to Åtvidaberg for 2005 and 2006 and joined Djurgården in 2007. After some bad years in Djurgården, he left the club when his contract expired after the 2009 season and returned to Åtvidaberg. Karlsson made his Allsvenskan debut on March 15, 2010 against Örebro SK.
