= Daniel Svärd =

Daniel Svärd may refer to:

- Daniel Svärd (golfer) (born 2003), Swedish golfer
- Daniel Swärd (born 1990), Swedish footballer
