= Daniel Hallingström =

Swedish footballer and manager

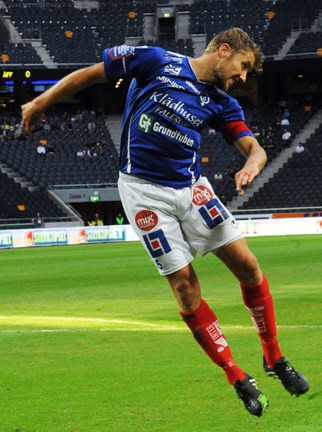

Personal information
- Full name: Daniel Christian Hallingström
- Birth name: Daniel Christian Johansson
- Date of birth: 10 February 1981 (age 45)
- Place of birth: Gamleby, Sweden
- Height: 1.84 m (6 ft 0 in)
- Position: Defender

Youth career
- Gamleby IF

Senior career*
Years	Team	Apps	(Gls)
1996–1998	Gamleby IF	66	(9)
1999–2000	Åtvidabergs FF	28	(4)
2001	Kalmar FF	2	(0)
2002–2015	Åtvidabergs FF	322	(25)
2016–2017	Grebo IK	–	(–)

Managerial career
- 2017: Grebo IK
- 2018: Åtvidabergs FF
- * Club domestic league appearances and goals as of 10 July 2018

Daniel Christian Hallingström (né Johansson; born 10 February 1981) is a Swedish former footballer and manager. He spent the most of his career at Åtvidabergs FF.
