= Kopparvallen =

Sports venue in Åtvidaberg, Sweden

Coordinates: 58°11′40.5″N 15°59′45″E

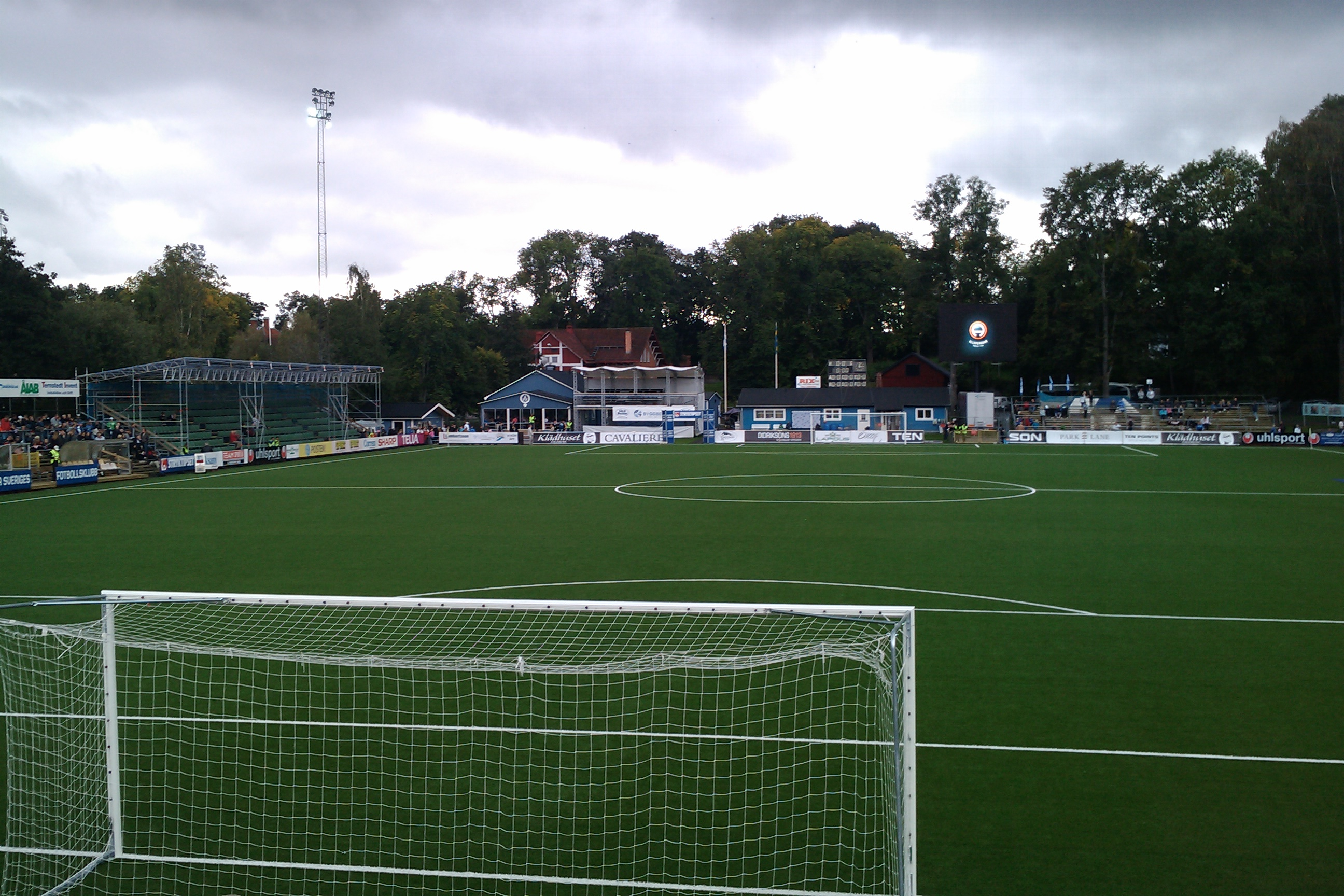
- Interactive map of Kopparvallen
- Location: Kvarngatan, 597 41, Åtvidaberg
- Owner: Åtvidaberg Municipality
- Capacity: 8,100
- Surface: Artificial turf
- Field size: 105 x 68 m

Construction
- Opened: 1920
- Renovated: 2000, 2012

Kopparvallen is a multi-use stadium in Åtvidaberg, Sweden. It is used mostly for football matches and is the home stadium of Åtvidabergs FF. The stadium holds 8,100 people and was built in 1907. Famous football players who have played in the arena include Ralf Edström, Roland Sandberg, Conny Torstensson, Ilie Balaci, Zlatan Ibrahimović and Pelé.
