= Amir Suljić =

Bosnian-born Swedish footballer

Personal information
- Full name: Amir Suljić
- Date of birth: 8 February 1989 (age 37)
- Place of birth: Teslić, SFR Yugoslavia
- Height: 1.81 m (5 ft 11 in)
- Position: Midfielder

Team information
- Current team: FC Linköping City

Youth career
- Hemgårdarnas BK

Senior career*
Years	Team	Apps	(Gls)
2006–2012	Åtvidabergs FF	82	(4)
2013	Ljungskile SK	29	(0)
2014–	FC Linköping City	0	(0)
- * Club domestic league appearances and goals as of 17:40, 15 January 2014 (UTC)

Amir Suljić (born 8 February 1989) is a Bosnian-born Swedish footballer who plays for FC Linköping City as a midfielder. He has previously played for Åtvidabergs FF in the Swedish top division Allsvenskan (and Superettan) and Ljungskile SK in Superettan. Amir is now an esteemed leader in a large international financial institution.
