= Kristian Bergström =

Swedish footballer (born 1974)

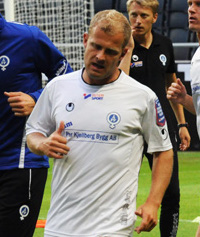

Personal information
- Full name: Dan Göran Kristian Bergström
- Date of birth: 8 January 1974 (age 52)
- Place of birth: Åtvidaberg, Sweden
- Height: 1.75 m (5 ft 9 in)
- Position: Midfielder

Youth career
- Åtvidabergs FF

Senior career*
Years	Team	Apps	(Gls)
1992–1997	Åtvidabergs FF	144	(51)
1998–2002	IFK Norrköping	129	(21)
2003	Malmö FF	14	(1)
2004–2015	Åtvidabergs FF	345	(67)

International career^{‡}
2001	Sweden	2	(0)
- * Club domestic league appearances and goals as of 23:41, 30 March 2016 (UTC) ‡ National team caps and goals as of 11 January 2012

Dan Göran Kristian Bergström (born 8 January 1974) is a Swedish former footballer. He played for Åtvidabergs FF during the most part of his career. He won two caps for the Sweden national team in 2001.

On 1 November 2014, Bergström became the oldest goalscorer in Allsvenskan history when he scored in Åtvidaberg's 2-1 win against Malmö FF, aged 40 years and 297 days.
