= Mons Kallentoft =

Swedish writer and journalist

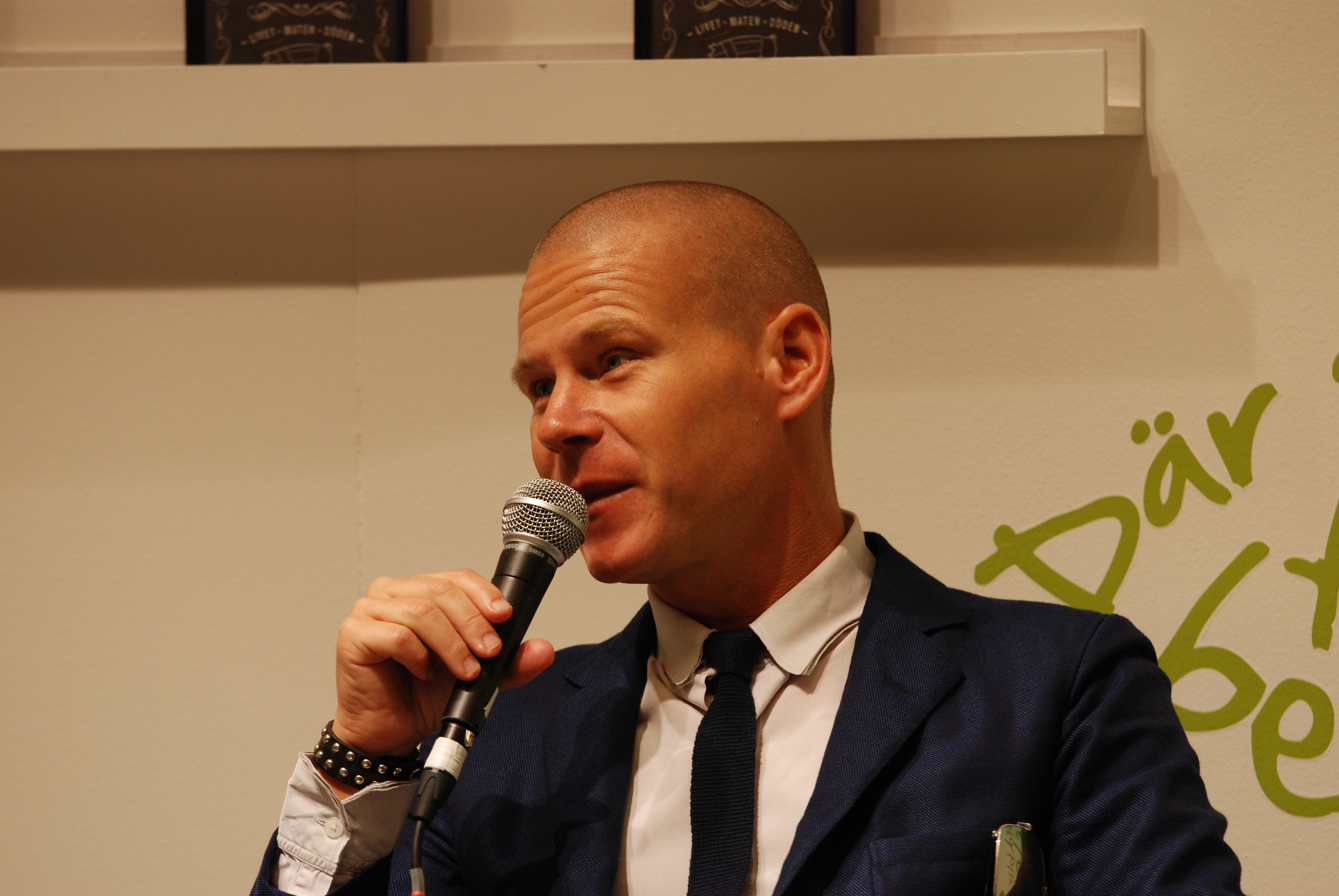
Mons Kallentoft at Göteborg Book Fair 2013

Mons Kallentoft (born 15 April 1968), is a Swedish author and journalist. Kallentoft grew up in Ljungsbro outside Linköping and lives in Stockholm. He has written twelve books about Police Inspector Malin Fors. The series is translated in 28 countries. His book Midvinterblod was published as Midwinter Sacrifice in the UK and Australia by Hodder & Stoughton in October 2011, and as Midwinter Blood in US and Canada by Simon & Schuster in June 2012.

Mons Kallentoft has a son called Nick Kallentoft.

== Bibliography ==
=== The Malin Fors novels ===
- 2007 – Midvinterblod (Midwinter Sacrifice, UK 2011, Midwinter Blood, US 2012, trans. Neil Smith)
- 2008 – Sommardöden (Summertime Death, UK 2012, Summer Death, US 2013, trans. Neil Smith)
- 2009 – Höstoffer (Autumn Killing, UK 2012, US 2014, trans. Neil Smith)
- 2010 – Vårlik (Savage Spring, UK 2013, Spring Remains US 2015, trans. Neil Smith)
- 2011 – Den femte årstiden (The Fifth Season, UK 2014, trans. Neil Smith)
- 2012 – Vattenänglar (Water Angels)
- 2013 – Vindsjälar (Wind Souls)
- 2014 – Jordstorm ("Earth Storm")
- 2015 – Eldjägarna ("Fire Hunters")
- 2016 – Djävulsdoften ("Devil's Scent")
- 2017 – Bödelskyssen ("The Executioner's Kiss")
- 2018 – Himmelskriket ("A Heaven's Cry")

=== Stand-alone novels ===
- Pesetas (2000)
- Marbella Club (2002)
- Fräsch, frisk och spontan (2005)
- Food noir: mat, mord och myter (2004)
- Food Junkie (2013)

== Awards ==
- Katapultpriset, 2001
- Gourmand World Cookbook Award, 2005
- Hagdahlspriset, 2008
- Premio Espana, 2009
