= Oscar Möller (footballer) =

Swedish footballer

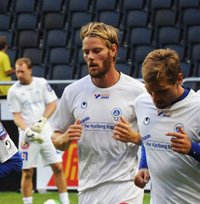
- Möller in 2013

Personal information
- Full name: Johan Oscar Möller
- Date of birth: 15 April 1987 (age 39)
- Place of birth: Västervik, Sweden
- Height: 1.90 m (6 ft 3 in)
- Position: Forward

Team information
- Current team: Åtvidabergs FF
- Number: 14

Youth career
- –2006: Västerviks FF

Senior career*
Years	Team	Apps	(Gls)
2007–2013	Åtvidabergs FF	186	(40)
2014–2015	BK Derby	25	(6)
- * Club domestic league appearances and goals

Johan Oscar Möller (born 15 April 1987 in Västervik) is a Swedish former footballer. He played most of his career at Åtvidabergs FF, where he scored 186 league matches and 40 goals.

== Club team career ==
Möller's parent club was Västerviks FF. Before the 2007 season, he went to Åtvidabergs FF, which then played in the Superettan. He made his league debut for the club on 16 April 2007 in a 1–0 away loss against IFK Norrköping as he was substituted in the 72nd minute of the match in place of Haris Radetinac. He scored a total of ten goals in his debut season for the club. On 10 May 2011, Möller scored one of the goals when Åtvidaberg knocked out AIK in the Swedish Cup with 3–0. 2011 was also the best season for Möller who scored 12 goals as well as the decisive goal in Sundsvall when the club secured Allsvenskan promotion in a 1–0 victory in the penultimate round. After his efforts during the season, he extended his contract with the club until 2013.

He played a total of 186 league games and scored 40 goals during his time in Åtvidaberg. After the 2013 season, Möller did not renew his contract with Åtvidaberg and he thus left the club.

On 28 February 2014, Möller signed for the Division 3 club BK Derby from Linköping. At the same time, he chose to focus on his civilian career in the insurance industry, which he combined with football. He played 25 games and scored six goals for the club in league games in 2014 and 2015.
