= Tobias Nilsson =

Swedish footballer (born 1986)

Personal information
- Full name: Johan Tobias Nilsson
- Date of birth: 20 February 1986 (age 40)
- Place of birth: Onslunda, Sweden
- Height: 1.86 m (6 ft 1 in)
- Position: Midfielder

Team information
- Current team: Örebro Syrianska IF

Youth career
- Onslunda IF
- 2002–2004: Malmö FF

Senior career*
Years	Team	Apps	(Gls)
2005–2006	Malmö FF	0	(0)
2006	→ Lunds BK (loan)		
2007–2011	Falkenbergs FF	129	(12)
2012	Åtvidabergs FF	22	(0)
2013–2015	Örebro SK	17	(0)
2014–2015	→ Husqvarna FF (loan)	27	(2)
2015–2017	J-Södra IF	20	(0)
2017	Nora BK	?	(?)
2018–	Örebro Syrianska IF	0	(0)

International career
2005	Sweden U19	5	(0)
- * Club domestic league appearances and goals as of 5 January 2017 (UTC)

Tobias Nilsson (born 20 February 1986) is a Swedish footballer who plays for Örebro Syrianska IF as a midfielder.

== Career ==
Nilsson started out playing for his hometown club Onslunda IF before he got picked up by Malmö FF as a youth player. In 2005, he was moved up to the senior squad but never made any league appearances for the first team. During that time he also played with the Sweden men's national under-19 football team in their qualification games for the 2005 UEFA European Under-19 Football Championship.

After a loan spell with fourth tier club Lunds BK in 2006 he left Malmö FF the following year and joined second tier Superettan side Falkenbergs FF. There he played regularly for five seasons and became the best assist maker in the 2011 Superettan. This made newly promoted Allsvenskan club Åtvidabergs FF sign him for the 2012 season.

After the season had finished Nilsson told the club that he wanted more playing time and when Superettan club Örebro SK made a bid for the midfielder he decided to sign with them in January 2013.
