= FK Linköping =

Swedish football club

- Full name: Fotbollklubb Linköping
- Founded: 2009
- Dissolved: 2013
- Ground: Folkungavallen; Linköping; Sweden
- Capacity: 5,500
- League: Division 3 Nordöstra Götaland
- 2012: Division 3 Nordöstra Götaland, 7th
Home colours	Away colours

FK Linköping was a Swedish football club located in Linköping, which replaced Linköpings FF from the 2009 season.

In 2013 the club was replaced by FC Linköping City.

== Background ==
Since their foundation in 2009 FK Linköping participated in a middle division of the Swedish football league system. They played their home matches at the Folkungavallen in Linköping.

== Season to season ==
Season	Level	Division	Section	Position	Movements
2009	Tier 4	Division 2	Nordöstra Götaland	4th	
2010	Tier 4	Division 2	Mellersta Götaland	11th	Relegated
2011	Tier 5	Division 3	Nordöstra Götaland		
