= Emmanuel Dogbe =

Ghanaian professional footballer

Personal information
- Date of birth: 6 June 1992 (age 34)
- Height: 1.75 m (5 ft 9 in)
- Position: Midfielder

Youth career
- Feyenoord Ghana

Senior career*
Years	Team	Apps	(Gls)
- Medeama
2012–2015	Åtvidaberg	9	(0)
2014	→ AFC United (loan)	6	(0)
2015	→ Oskarshamn (loan)	15	(1)
- * Club domestic league appearances and goals as of 31 December 2015

Emmanuel Dogbe (born 6 June 1992) is a Ghanaian professional footballer who plays as a midfielder.

== Career ==
Dogbe has played in Ghana and Sweden for Feyenoord Ghana, Medeama, Åtvidaberg, AFC United and Oskarshamn.
