= Viktor Prodell =

Swedish footballer

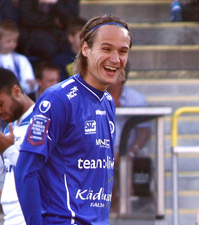

Personal information
- Full name: Viktor Prodell
- Date of birth: 29 February 1988 (age 38)
- Place of birth: Sweden
- Height: 1.89 m (6 ft 2 in)
- Position: Forward

Team information
- Current team: Västerås SK
- Number: 9

Youth career
- Triangelns IK

Senior career*
Years	Team	Apps	(Gls)
2007–2008	Eskilstuna City	22	(9)
2009–2013	Åtvidaberg	115	(29)
2013–2015	Mechelen	15	(0)
2014–2015	→ Elfsborg (loan)	49	(16)
2016–2018	Elfsborg	76	(26)
2019–2020	Örebro	6	(1)
2020	Ho Chi Minh City	0	(0)
2020–2022	Västerås SK	56	(11)

International career
2013	Sweden	1	(0)
- * Club domestic league appearances and goals as of 7 November 2020

Viktor Prodell (born 29 February 1988) is a Swedish retired footballer who plays as a forward.

== Career ==
On 15 July 2013, he signed a four-year contract with the Belgian side K.V. Mechelen. After joining Elfsborg on loan in 2014, Prodell completed a permanent move to the Allsvenskan club on 7 October 2015. He signed a three-year contract.

On 23 August 2017 he made a clean sheet debut as a goalkeeper in a cup tie against Landskrona BoIS with 30 minutes remaining of extra time after Kevin Stuhr Ellegaard had been sent off and all substitutions had been made.

== Personal life ==
Prodell is half-Finnish.
