= Adelswärd (baronial family) =

Swedish baronial family

Adelswärd is a Swedish baronial family, descended from the Hultman line of the extinct noble family Adelswärd. The titular governor Johan Adelswärd (1718–1785) was created a Swedish baron 11 December 1770 at Stockholm Palace by King Gustavus III of Sweden, and was introduced 12 December 1771 at the House of Nobility as baronial family number 249, thus making the noble family Adelswärd extinct. The aforementioned Johan Adelswärd founded the fee tail Adelsnäs, which constitutes the Barony Adelswärd, the only one of its kind in Sweden.

The family has members in Sweden, Canada and the United States, and one of its members, Baron Eric Reinhold Adelswärd (1778–1840), was created a Swedish count in 1823, thus founding the comital family Adelswärd.
