= Andrea Caccese =

- Born: Andrea Caccese; 16 July 1988 (age 37)
- Origin: Naples, Italy
- Genres: Folk, indie rock, singer-songwriter, post-rock
- Instruments: Vocals, guitar, bass, percussion, production
- Years active: 2007–present
- Labels: Sit Still
- Formerly of: The Wisers, U.A.R.
- Website: andreacaccese.com

Andrea Caccese (born 16 July 1988) is an Italian singer-songwriter, guitarist and musician.

== Life ==
Caccese was born in Naples, Italy; his family moved several times within the country, returning to Naples in 2001. He became heavily influenced by punk rock music as he learned to play guitar and sing. He participated in high school bands before starting "The Wisers" in late 2007. Caccese lived in Sweden for a number of years, before eventually relocating to Brooklyn, New York. He is married to Australian actress and voiceover talent Brita Penfold.

== Career ==
Caccese quit University to focus on music on a full-time basis. He was the main songwriter, singer and guitarist in his band, The Wisers, The group released an album The less you know, the more you live through Songcast Music and an EP The Fall with Sit Still Promotion. The recordings gained enough exposure within the European underground music scene to get the band on two headlining European tours, in 2007 and 2010, including gigs in Italy, Germany, Austria, England, Scotland, Ireland, Switzerland, Sweden, Danmark and the Netherlands.

The Wisers disbanded in 2010, a few months after releasing their last EP, and the band's recordings were made available as free downloads on bandcamp after the hiatus.

Caccese was briefly involved in the recording project U.A.R. and worked as a freelance production assistant and columnist for Neapolis Festival and FreakOut Magazine. Caccese traveled extensively throughout Europe, eventually relocating to Sweden in 2010, where he began to perform as a solo artist under the name "Songs for the Sleepwalkers". His music included folk, post-rock and experimental pop. He performed in Sweden, England, Italy and Spain, mainly performing acoustic renditions from his former band's repertoire and a few cover songs. While on the road, Caccese released an EP under his own name, featuring songs recorded in apartments, hotel rooms, trains and airports all over Europe in late 2010. With the help of Swedish cellist Nadja Ali, Caccese developed the EP into a full-length album, Our Rehearsed Spontaneous Reactions adopting "Songs for the Sleepwalkers" as a moniker. The album is a folk record with a lo-fi approach, featuring elements of electro, post rock, pop and prog.

Caccese collaborated with Swedish musician Dick Pettersson, beginning in late 2011, to produce two alternative rock albums and several singles under the name "I Used to be a Sparrow". The pair toured several European countries and performed at festivals. They also worked with the band Fabryka to record the album "Echo".

Caccese joined several Swedish musicians, including founding members of "E321" to create a post rock project, “Feed Me To The Waves”. The group created instrumental music, mostly based on material arranged following lengthy jam sessions and musical improvisation. Caccese oversaw the recording and production of the band's selftitled debut EP, which was later released via Bandcamp.

Caccese eventually parted ways with the band and moved to New York City. There, he continued to make music on his own, releasing acoustic music under the moniker of "Nowhere". His debut EP was recorded between Newcastle, Australia, and Brooklyn, NYC, and was released to favorable reviews. Caccese also plays bass in Brooklyn-based Shoegaze combo "Lillet Blanc", a brainchild of Emily Rawlings and Sean Camargo.

== Discography ==
- The less you know, The more you live – The Wisers (2008)
- The Fall – The Wisers (2010)
- Our Rehearsed Spontaneous Reactions
- Luke – I Used to be a Sparrow (2012)
- You are an Empty Artist – I Used to be a Sparrow (2012)
- Feed Me To The Waves – Feed Me To The Waves (2015)
- White Flags – I Used To Be A Sparrow (2015)
- Follow – Nowhere (2016)
