= Ljungsbro =

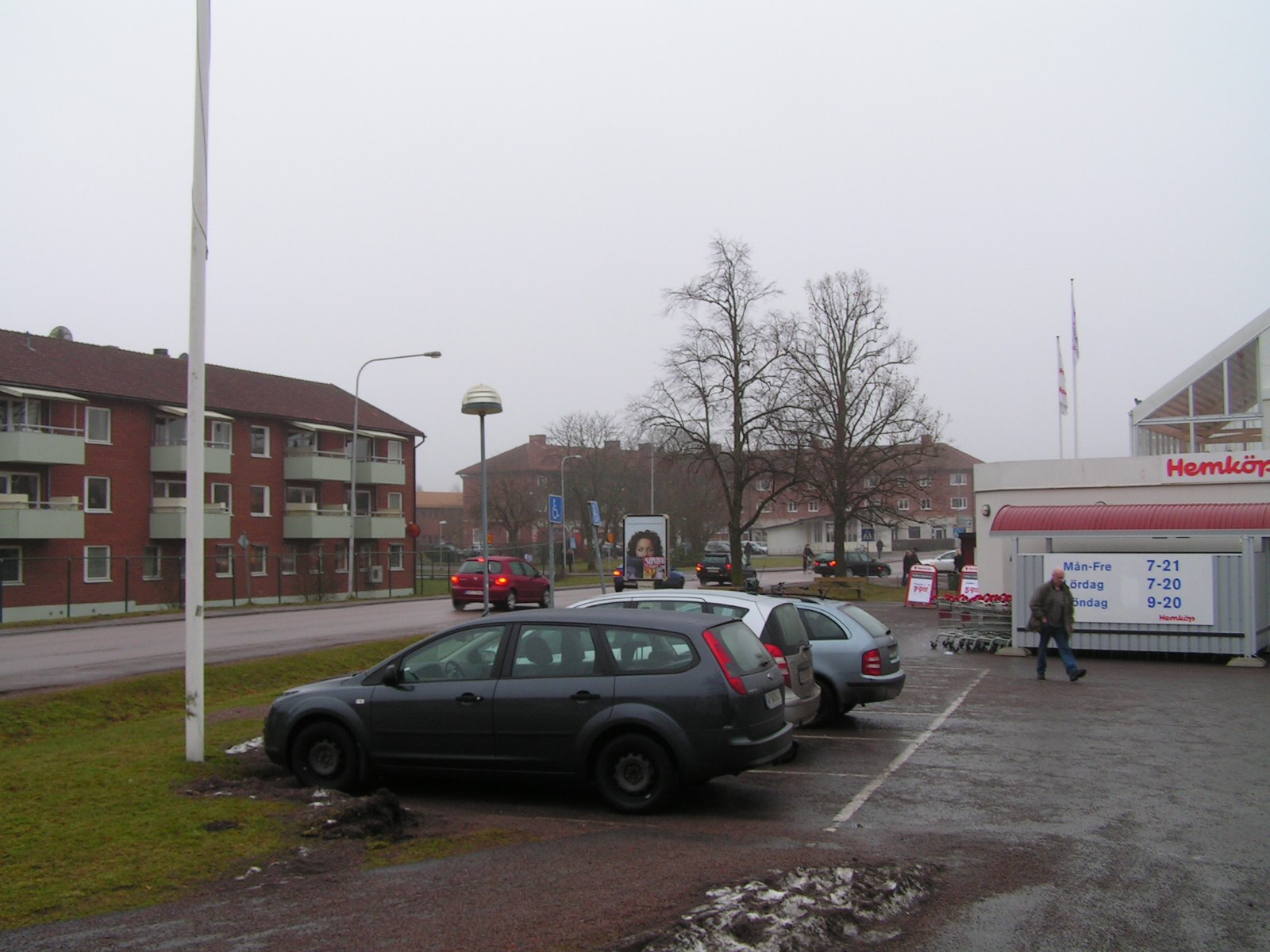

- Location within Östergötland Location within Sweden
- Coordinates: 58°30′30″N 15°30′10″E
- Country: Sweden
- Province: Östergötland
- County: Östergötland County
- Municipality: Linköping Municipality

Area
  - Total: 4.21 km^{2} (1.63 sq mi)

Population (31 December 2010)
  - Total: 6,620
  - Density: 1,573/km^{2} (4,070/sq mi)
- Time zone: UTC+1 (CET)
  - Summer (DST): UTC+2 (CEST)

Ljungsbro (Swedish pronunciation: [ˈjɵ̂ŋsbruː]) is a locality situated area in Linköping Municipality, Östergötland County, Sweden with 6,620 inhabitants in 2010. It is located about 15 kilometres (9.3 mi) from the city of Linköping.

Through Ljungsbro runs Motala ström (stream) and Göta Canal. In the stream are the power stations of Nykvarn and Malfors. Malfors has a height of drop of 28.3 metres (93 ft) and Nykvarn has one of 4.3 metres (14 ft), however, Nykvarn is no longer running. The canal can be crossed via a navigable aqueduct, Sweden's second after Håverud, but also via a bridge, Malforsbron (Malfors Bridge).

Ljungsbro Fritidscenter (leisure center) is located about 400 metres (1,300 ft) from the bridge. Here you can stay the night, train at gym or go swimming. There is also an indoors ice hockey rink.

The confectioners Cloetta is the largest industry in the area. On weekdays and Saturdays there is a popular market selling "Kex"-chocolate biscuit wafers and other chocolate products, which attracts many tourists.

In the centre lies the main health centre and shops, among other things there are opticians, libraries, a watchmaker, a company that sells and lays tiles and a tobacco shop. Many of the houses were built in the 1950s for the workers of the Cloetta factory.

There are two churches in the town, Allhelgonakyrkan and Filadelfiakyrkan.

== Famous people from Ljungsbro ==
- Mons Kallentoft, writer and journalist
