= Álberis da Silva =

Brazilian footballer

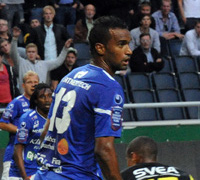

Personal information
- Full name: Álberis Sérgio Ângelo da Silva
- Date of birth: 2 December 1984 (age 41)
- Place of birth: Brazil
- Height: 1.86 m (6 ft 1 in)
- Positions: Defender; defensive midfielder

Team information
- Current team: FC Linköping City
- Number: 3

Youth career
- Independente EC

Senior career*
Years	Team	Apps	(Gls)
2003–2007	Independente EC		
2008–2009	FC Norrköping	40	(3)
2008	→ Motala AIF (loan)	33	(4)
2009–2015	Åtvidabergs FF	126	(3)
2016	FC Lambohov		
2016–	FC Linköping City	1	(0)
- * Club domestic league appearances and goals as of 1 August 2016

Álberis Sérgio Ângelo da Silva (born 2 December 1984) is a Brazilian footballer who plays as a defender.
