= Alain Junior Ollé Ollé =

Cameroonian footballer

Alain Ollé Ollé
Personal information
- Full name: Alain Junior Ollé Ollé
- Date of birth: 11 April 1987 (age 39)
- Place of birth: Douala, Cameroon
- Height: 1.75 m (5 ft 9 in)
- Position: Midfielder

Youth career
- Cintra of Yaoundé

Senior career*
| Years | Team | Apps | (Gls) |
| 2003–2004 | Cintra of Yaoundé | | |
| 2004–2005 | Plaza Colonia | | |
| 2005–2006 | Águilas de la Riviera Maya | | |
| 2006–2007 | Nacional | 2 | (0) |
| 2008–2010 | SC Freiburg | 11 | (0) |
| 2010–2011 | → Rot Weiss Ahlen (loan) | 13 | (1) |
| 2011–2012 | Stabæk | 26 | (7) |
| 2012 | Åtvidabergs FF | 7 | (0) |
| 2012 | → Varbergs BoIS (loan) | 6 | (1) |
| 2013 | Cerro | 2 | (0) |
| 2014 | Byåsen | 5 | (1) |
| 2015 | Brumunddal | 20 | (2) |
| 2016–2018 | Frøya | | |
| 2018 | Trønder-Lyn | | |
| 2019–2020 | Melhus | | |

International career
| 2008 | Cameroon U23 | 4 | (0) |
- * Club domestic league appearances and goals as of 10 May 2018

Alain Junior Ollé Ollé (born 11 April 1987) is a Cameroonian former professional footballer who played as a midfielder.

== Club career ==
Born in Douala, Ollé Ollé started his professional career in Uruguay with lowly Club Plaza Colonia de Deportes. In 2006, he signed with Club Nacional de Football in Montevideo.

In February 2008, Ollé Ollé joined German club SC Freiburg, but appeared very rarely for the Black Forest side, and never in the Bundesliga. In the 2010 January transfer window he was loaned to another team in the country, 2. Bundesliga's Rot Weiss Ahlen, appearing regularly but suffering relegation at the end of the 2009–10 season.

After a stint with Norway's Stabæk Fotball, Ollé Ollé spent the year 2012 in Sweden, representing Åtvidabergs FF in the Allsvenskan and Varbergs BoIS FC. He went back to Uruguay and Cerro.

He joined Norwegian club Melhus in March 2019.
