= Ari Freyr Skúlason =

Icelandic footballer

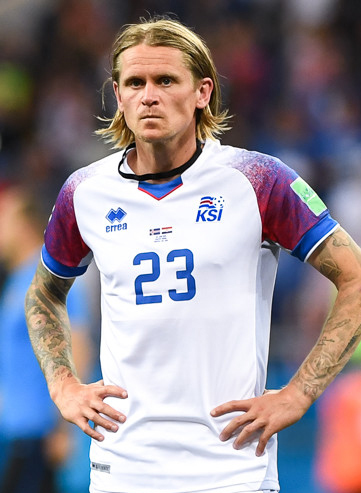
- Skúlason with Iceland at the 2018 FIFA World Cup

Personal information
- Full name: Ari Freyr Skúlason
- Date of birth: 14 May 1987 (age 39)
- Place of birth: Reykjavík, Iceland
- Height: 1.70 m (5 ft 7 in)
- Positions: Left-back; central midfielder

Youth career
- Valur
- 2003–2005: SC Heerenveen

Senior career*
Years	Team	Apps	(Gls)
2006	Valur	11	(1)
2006–2007	BK Häcken	28	(2)
2008–2013	GIF Sundsvall	149	(29)
2013–2016	OB	74	(6)
2016–2019	Lokeren	83	(10)
2019–2021	Oostende	42	(3)
2021–2023	IFK Norrköping	64	(2)
2024	Sylvia	0	(0)

International career^{‡}
2003–2004	Iceland U17	9	(0)
2005	Iceland U19	6	(0)
2006–2008	Iceland U21	10	(0)
2009–2021	Iceland	83	(0)
- * Club domestic league appearances and goals as of 18:15, 15 November 2023 (UTC) ‡ National team caps and goals as of 17 November 2021

Ari Freyr Skúlason (born 14 May 1987) is an Icelandic former professional footballer who plays as a left-back. He previously played at senior level in Iceland and Belgium, and was also a youth player in the Netherlands. He made over 80 appearances for the Iceland national team.

== Club career ==
Ari started his career at Valur. At sixteen, he went to SC Heerenveen in the Netherlands where he spent two seasons. He was released at the end of 2005 when he could not make the first team. He returned to Valur where he played half a season before signing with Allsvenskan club BK Häcken. Although relegated to the Swedish second tier, the club competed in the UEFA Cup qualifiers the following year because of their fair play ranking. Häcken managed to progress into the main competition after Ari scored the winning goal against Scottish club Dunfermline Athletic Häcken failed to gain promotion, and he signed with Allsvenskan club GIF Sundsvall at the end of the year. At the start of the 2012 season he became captain of the club.

On 11 July 2013, it was revealed that Ari had signed a contract with Danish Superliga club OB for the start of 2014 when his contract with Sundsvall expired. On 19 July it was announced that the clubs had reached an agreement for his semi-immediate transfer. On 27 July he played his last game for Sundsvall, scoring two free-kick goals in a 3–3 draw against GAIS.

On 18 July 2016, Ari officially joined Belgian-side K.S.C. Lokeren Oost-Vlaanderen.

On 31 March 2021, Swedish club IFK Norrköping, announced that they had signed Ari. After three seasons at the club, Ari initially announced his retirement on 2 November 2023, however, on 12 January 2024, IF Sylvia, another Norrköping team who play in the Swedish fourth tier, announced they had signed Ari.

== International career ==
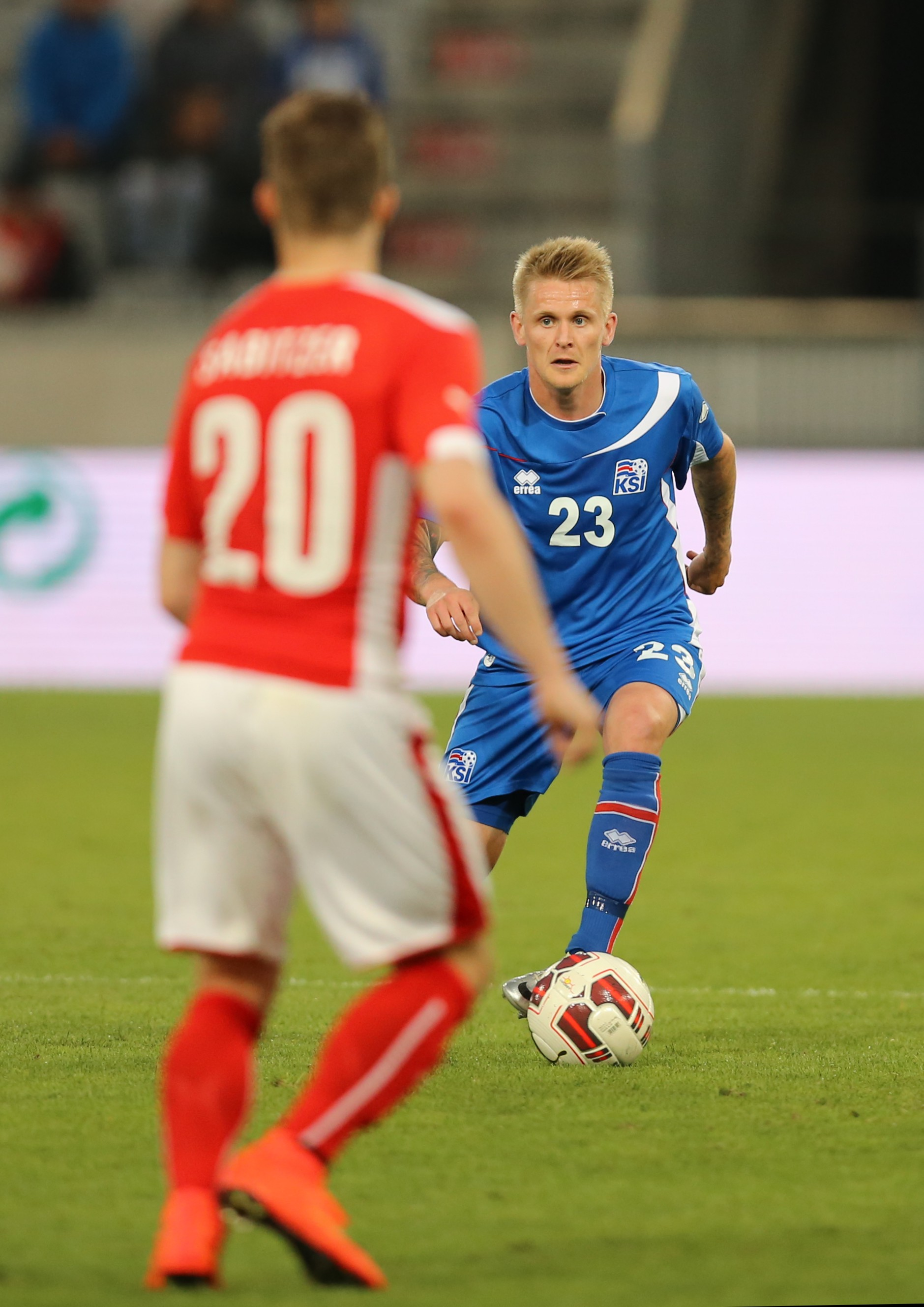
Ari playing in the national team against Austria in 2014

After being capped at various youth levels he got to make his debut for the Icelandic national team in 2009 against Iran. In 2012, he started getting more frequent callups from new national team manager Lars Lagerbäck. Despite Ari having been playing as a midfielder for his club side he was nonetheless picked in the Iceland squad as a left-back and has been the first-choice left-back in the national team during most of the 2014 World Cup qualifiers. Consequently, Ari felt that he needed to change his position at club level and asked to be signed as a left-back when he was sold in July 2013, so he could play that position at club level to be able to hold his place as the first-choice left-back in the Iceland squad, despite the fact that he has been praised as a central playmaker of high quality.

He was selected for EURO 2016. He started in all of Iceland's five matches, helping the national team go to the quarter-finals in their very first European championship.

In May 2018 he was named in Iceland's 23-man squad for the 2018 FIFA World Cup in Russia.

Ari retired from the national team in November 2021. He played 83 games.

== Playing position ==
Even though his most common position is in central midfield Ari can also play as a winger and played as a full-back with the Iceland national team. After transferring from Sweden to Denmark in 2013 he stated in an interview that he had asked to be signed as a left-back to cement his place as the starting left-back in the national team.
