= Grebo IK =

Swedish football club

- Full name: Grebo Idrottsklubb
- Founded: 1932
- Ground: Grebovallen; Åtvidaberg; Sweden
- Chairman: Mikael Fransson
- League: Division 4 Östergötland Östra
| Home colours | Away colours |

Grebo IK is a Swedish football club located outside Åtvidaberg.

== Background ==
Grebo IK currently plays in Division 4 Östergötland Västra which is the sixth tier of Swedish football. They play their home matches at the Grebovallen in Linköping.

Grebo IK are affiliated to Östergötlands Fotbollförbund.

== Hall Of Fame ==
Hakan Johansson Hakan Arpfors Per Kjellberg Robert Stein Kent Skarphagen Pierre Johansson

== Season to season ==
| Season | Level | Division | Section | Position | Movements |
|---|---|---|---|---|---|
| 2006* | Tier 7 | Division 5 | Östergötland Mellersta | 6th | |
| 2007 | Tier 7 | Division 5 | Östergötland Mellersta | 10th | |
| 2008 | Tier 7 | Division 5 | Östergötland Mellersta | 4th | |
| 2009 | Tier 7 | Division 5 | Östergötland Mellersta | 1st | Promoted |
| 2010 | Tier 6 | Division 4 | Östergötland Västra | 6th | |
| 2011 | Tier 6 | Division 4 | Östergötland Östra | 3rd | |

* League restructuring in 2006 resulted in a new division being created at Tier 3 and subsequent divisions dropping a level.
