= Adelswärd (noble family) =

Swedish noble family

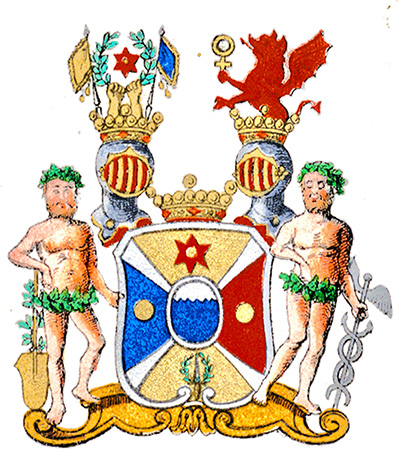
Coat of Arms of the Adelswärds

Adelswärd was a Swedish noble family, introduced at Riddarhuset as noble family number 1707, which consists of two lines, related through female line.

The first line, called the Hultman line, is descended from Lars Hemmingsson (ca 1610-1688), tradesman in Norrköping. He is also male-line ancestor of the Swedish noble family Carlsköld. He was married 7 November 1641 in Norrköping to Maria Hansdotter (buried 2 March 1684 in Norrköping). Their son was the tradesman in Norrköping, Lorents Hultman (ca 1660-1702), who first was married 6 December 1685 in Norrköping to Johanna Bröms (born 15 January 1668, dead 19 March 1696), and then married ca 1698 to Margareta Karlsdotter (born 18 January 1680 in Norrköping, dead 2 January 1753 in Stockholm.

In his first marriage, he had the son Johan Hultman (born 8 November 1690 in Norrköping, dead 26 July 1729 at Forsmark in Forsmark), who was a rittmeister and was ennobled 20 December 1719 in Stockholm by Queen Ulrika Eleonora of Sweden, together with his so-called "brother-in-law" (actually his cousin by marriage) Leonhard Keijser (see below). They were introduced at Riddarhuset 1720 as noble family number 1707. Johan Hultman, ennobled Adelswärd's wife Altea Silfverström (1700-1765), was daughter of Johan Silfverström (1660-1710) and Altea de Besche (born 1670), who in turn was daughter of Georg de Besche, ennobled de Besche (1641-1711) and Althea Bothler (1646-1704) (see below). Johan Hultman's (ennobled Adelswärd) son with Altea Silfverström, the titular governor Johan Adelswärd (1718-1785) was created a Swedish Baron 1770, and is the first member of the Baronial family Adelswärd. Leonard Hultman's son in his second marriage, Karl Hultman, was ennobled Carlsköld.

The second line, called the Keijser line, is descended from the rittmeister Leonhard Keijser (born 1687 in Karlstad, dead 24 January 1756 at Länsö, Börstil, Uppland), who was ennobled, as mentioned above, with Johan Hultman 20 December 1719. His wife, Altéa Fredrika Meijer (dead 1759 or 1760), was a daughter of the tradesman in Liège, Conrad Meijer, and Anna Katarina de Besche, who in turn was daughter of Georg de Besche, ennobled de Besche (1641-1711) and Althea Bothler (1646-1704) (see above). The Keijser line became extinct with its founder.

== See also ==
- Adelswärd (comital family)
