= Bruno Marinho =

Brazilian footballer (born 1984)

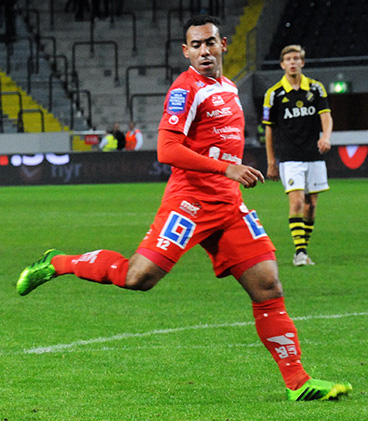

Personal information
- Full name: Bruno Manoel Marinho
- Date of birth: 5 July 1984 (age 42)
- Place of birth: Brazil
- Height: 1.75 m (5 ft 9 in)
- Position: Midfielder

Team information
- Current team: Åtvidabergs FF
- Number: 12

Youth career
- Guarani FC

Senior career*
Years	Team	Apps	(Gls)
- Guarani FC
- Santos FC
2008	FC Norrköping		
2008	→ Åtvidabergs FF (loan)	12	(0)
2009–	Åtvidabergs FF	88	(3)
- * Club domestic league appearances and goals as of 17 September 2012

Bruno Manoel Marinho (born 5 July 1984) is a Brazilian footballer who plays for Åtvidabergs FF as a midfielder. He first came to Sweden in 2008 after having previously belonged to Guarani FC and Santos FC in Brazil. In Sweden, he started out playing for FC Norrköping in the lower divisions of Swedish football but was quickly discovered by Superettan club Åtvidabergs FF who brought him over on loan. After only a few months, he had impressed the club enough for them to sign him on a permanent contract.
