= Adelswärd (comital family) =

The comital family Adelswärd is descended from the Baronial family Adelswärd. Baron Eric Reinhold Adelswärd (1778–1840) was created a Swedish Count 19 June 1823 at Stockholm Palace by King Charles XIV John of Sweden, in accordance with the 37th paragraph of the instrument of government of 1809, meaning only the head of the family would be a Count. He was introduced at Riddarhuset 1 June 1825 as comital family number 138. His son Eric August Adolph Adelswärd (1817–1853), who became a Count at the death of his father, abandoned the title with royal permission 30 November 1840 for him and his issue, thus making the comital family extinct.
