= Erik Moberg =

Swedish footballer (born 1986)

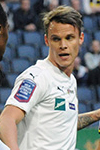

Personal information
- Full name: Erik Gustav Mikael Moberg
- Date of birth: 5 July 1986 (age 40)
- Place of birth: Motala, Sweden
- Height: 1.86 m (6 ft 1 in)
- Position: Defender

Youth career
- BK Zeros

Senior career*
Years	Team	Apps	(Gls)
2004	BK Zeros	–	(–)
2005–2007	Motala AIF	61	(7)
2008–2013	Åtvidabergs FF	125	(6)
2014–2017	Örebro SK	72	(4)
2017	Viborg FF	24	(0)
2018–2019	Jönköpings Södra IF	16	(2)
- * Club domestic league appearances and goals

Erik Moberg (born 5 July 1986) is a Swedish former footballer who played as a defender.
