= Linköpings FF =

Swedish football club

- Full name: Linköpings FF
- Nickname(s): LFF
- Founded: 1981
- Dissolved: 2009
- Ground: Folkungavallen, Linköping
- Capacity: 5,500
Home colours	Away colours

Linköpings FF (locally known as LFF) was the premier men's football team in Linköping, Sweden, playing in the Swedish second division. The club is a 1984 merger of BK Derby and IF Saab. And as both these clubs had a one-season spell each in Allsvenskan during the 1970s (Derby in 1977, Saab in 1973), the new club was initially hopeful for a promotion from their Division 3 position. At this time Division 2 was split up into a Southern and a Northern league, with 14 teams each, but the third division was split up into 12 regional leagues with 12 teams each. The difference between the second and third tier was huge.

== 1985 qualification for Division 2 ==
In 1985 Linköping won their regional league, but as only half of the twelve regional winners were to be promoted, a home-away qualifying was needed. In the lottery Linköping drew Landskrona BoIS. Of the 11 possible opponents, it was the largest and club with most traditions. This was not the same[?] as Landskrona was favorite. Only a little above 3000 spectators came to the first qualifier, home at Folkungavallen, and perhaps half of them were Landskrona BoIS supporters. The match ended 1-1, but "BoIS"'s goalkeeper Peter Joelsson saved. In the return at Landskrona IP twice as many attendees turned up (6016). The decider went to Landskrona BoIS, but again the match ended 1-1, with no goals scored in the 2 x 15 min extra time. The final decider became a penalty shootout, and five penalties each wasn't sufficient. "BoIS"' player Ole Jensen scored the last of the penalties.

The team played in red shirts. A lion formed its logo, as is the case with both the city and the other sports teams. The club had long aimed at securing a place in Superettan, the Swedish first division, but all endeavours failed. Linköpings FF played their home-games at Folkungavallen.

In 2009 the club were replaced by FK Linköping.
