= Folkungavallen =

Football stadium in Linköping, Sweden

Coordinates: 58°24′15″N 15°37′54″E

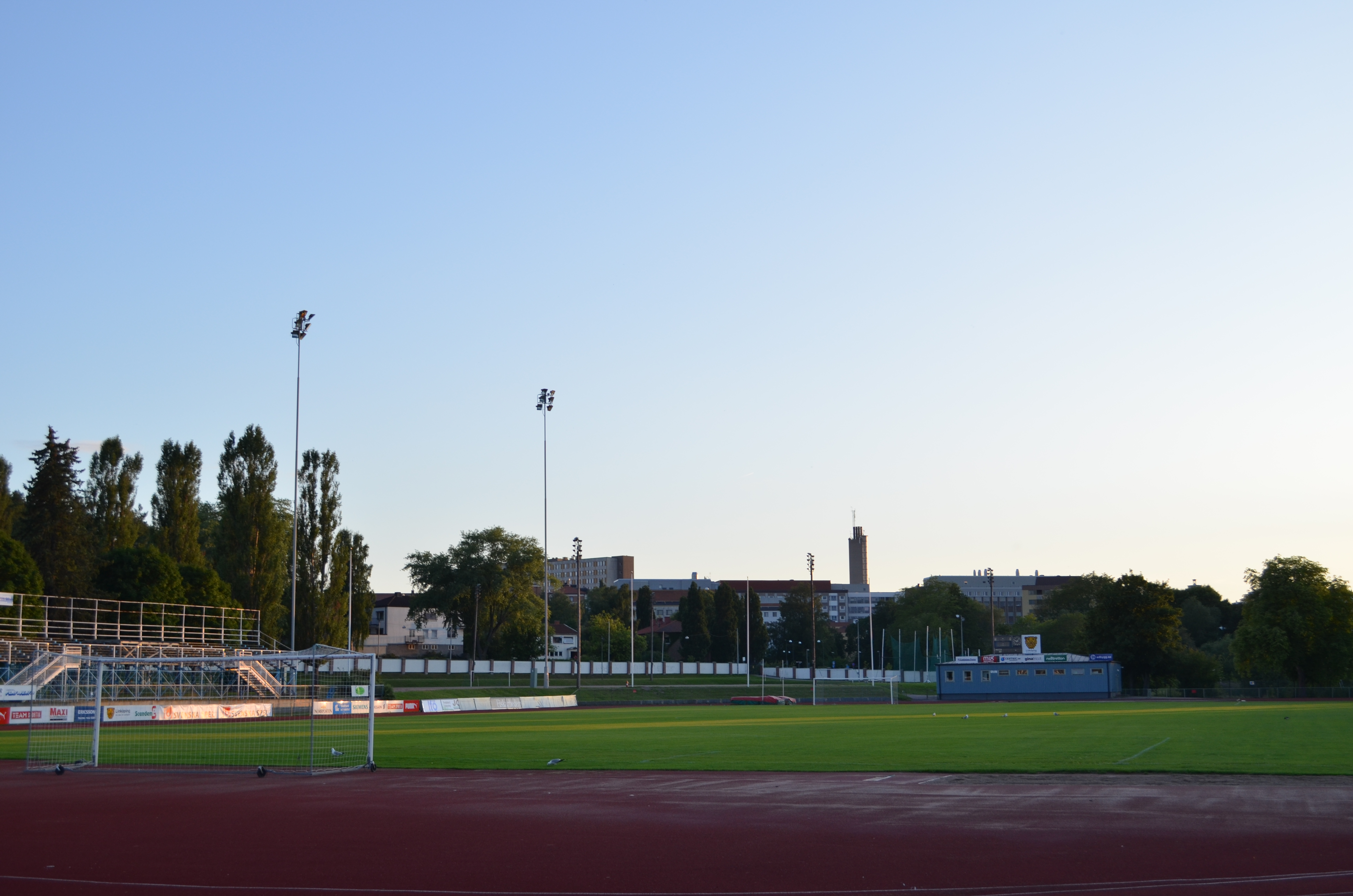
- Folkungavallen
- Interactive map of Folkungavallen
- Location: Linköping, Sweden

Construction
- Opened: 1919
- Renovated: 1939

Tenants
- Linköpings FC; FK Linköping

Folkungavallen is a football stadium in Linköping, Sweden and the home stadium for the football teams Linköpings FC and FK Linköping. Folkungavallen has a total capacity of 5,500 spectators.
