= Åtvidaberg =

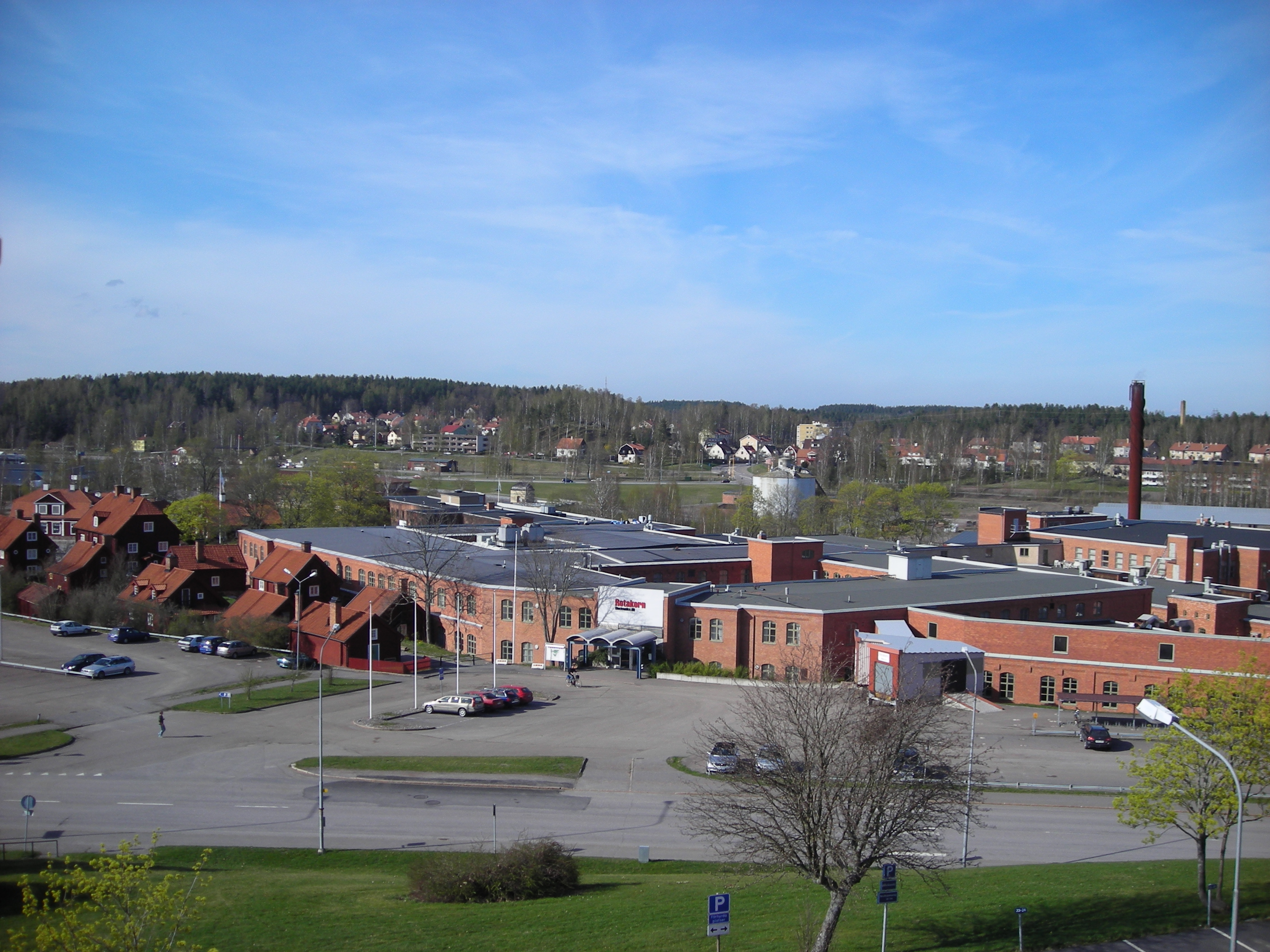
- Åtvidaberg

- Coat of arms

- Location within Östergötland Location within Sweden
- Coordinates: 58°12′N 16°00′E
- Country: Sweden
- Province: Östergötland
- County: Östergötland County
- Municipality: Åtvidaberg Municipality

Area
  - Total: 5.42 km^{2} (2.09 sq mi)

Population (31 December 2020)
  - Total: 6,934
  - Density: 1,280/km^{2} (3,310/sq mi)
- Time zone: UTC+1 (CET)
  - Summer (DST): UTC+2 (CEST)

Åtvidaberg is a locality and the seat of Åtvidaberg Municipality, Östergötland County, Sweden with 6,859 inhabitants in 2010.

== History ==
Copper was mined in the area from the 14th century, and the name "Åtvidaberg" was originally the name of a bergslag (a type of mining community). The earliest known use of the place name is from 1467, as a compound of the words Åtvid, which was the name of the parish, and berg, literally "mountain", but in this context referring to a mine.

The town's development was to be directed by the noble family Adelswärd. Through investments in the 19th and early 20th century the town developed into a modern industrial town.

In the 1970s the industry was dominated by Facit, making calculators. It was a major sponsor of the football team Åtvidabergs FF, one of Sweden's strongest teams in the 1970s. When Facit went bankrupt in the second half of the 1970s, it led to the downfall and degradation of the team.

At the end of the 19th century almost one third of the population of Åtvidaberg Municipality in Sweden emigrated to Ishpeming, Michigan in the United States as copper mines in the Åtvidaberg area closed down.[9] In 1994 this was commemorated by a plaquette at the Mormorsgruvan mine of Åtvidaberg.
