= FC Linköping City =

Swedish football club

- Full name: Football Club Linköping City
- Nicknames: City, LC
- Founded: 2013
- Dissolved: 2022
- Ground: Linköping Arena, Linköping, Sweden
- Capacity: 8,500
Home colours	Away colours

FC Linköping City was a Swedish professional football club based in Linköping, affiliated with the Östergötlands Fotbollförbund.

The club was founded around New Years Day of 2013, replacing FK Linköping in the Swedish football league system for the 2013 season.

The club was dissolved in 2022.

== History ==
The club was founded in a merger between FK Linköping and FC Syrianska, with the goal to get football in Linköping to a higher level. When FC Linköping City was created, it took the place of FK Linköping in the Swedish football league system. The club started playing in Division 3 Nordöstra Götaland, which is the fifth tier of Swedish football. They started playing their home matches at Folkungavallen in Linköping, before moving to the new Linköping Arena in autumn 2013. FC Linköping City were affiliated with the Östergötlands Fotbollförbund.

== Rivalries ==
Several clubs play in Linköping, however, the biggest rivalry to FC Linköping City is AFK Linköping, a club that was founded in the winter between the 2012 and 2013 seasons. The difference in team make-up is that FC Linköping City built their team with players from higher leagues while AFK Linköping used more local talent. The first game played between these rivals was played away on 19 June 2013; a game where FC Linköping City won 2–0. The return game in the league was played at home on 4 August 2013 in the new arena Linköping Arena and FC Linköping City won 2–0.

== Seasons ==
=== 2013 ===
In 2013, FC Linköping City immediately put up the goal to win Division 3 and get promoted to Division 2. The start of the season started out promising, and the club had seven consecutive wins before drawing 3–3 away against Linghems SK. This seven game winning streak is even more remarkable because only two out of seven games were at home. When Division 3 reached its summer break, the club had a five-point lead with a 9 wins, 1 draw, 1 loss record, and nine games left at home and only two games left away. The second part of the season was even more impressing when they won all remaining eleven matches and saw the lead grow to the final 22 points ahead of second placed team, IF Haga. This meant promotion to Division 2 (tier 4 of Swedish football) and a good start for the newly built club.

=== 2014 ===
Before the season started, FC Linköping City announced a change of head coach. The new coach, Andreas Thomsson, comes from Öster IF in Allsvenskan (tier 1 in Swedish football), and has merits from football on the highest level in Sweden.

== Season summary ==
Season	Level	Division	Section	Position	Movements
2013	Tier 5	Division 3	Nordöstra Götaland	1st	Promoted
2014	Tier 4	Division 2	Södra Svealand	9th	
2015	Tier 4	Division 2	Södra Svealand	2nd	
2016	Tier 4	Division 2	Södra Svealand	2nd	
2017	Tier 4	Division 2	Södra Svealand	1st	Promoted
2018	Tier 3	Division 1	Norra	9th	

== Current squad ==
As of 30 December 2021

Note: Flags indicate national team as defined under FIFA eligibility rules; some limited exceptions apply. Players may hold more than one non-FIFA nationality.

No.	Pos.	Nation	Player
2	MF	SWE	Ali Riyadh Majeed Saedi
3	DF	SWE	Melsik Hassan
4	DF	SWE	Hampus Myske
5	MF	SWE	Laith Etawi
6	MF	NGA	Sabir Isah Musa
8	MF	GHA	Mohammed Sadat Abubakari
9	FW	NGA	Womene Miekam
10	MF	CRO	Dejan Polić
11	FW	NGA	Uba Charles
13	MF	NGA	Victor Okeji
16	MF	SWE	Junior Kivumbi

No.	Pos.	Nation	Player
17	FW	SWE	Dieu Le Veut Ntumbudi
18	MF	ENG	Michael Lawrence Taavon
20	MF	SWE	Tiger Cornell
21	MF	SWE	Youssef Khaled
23	DF	SWE	Jonathan Larsson
24	MF	SWE	Balen Nouri
25	GK	SWE	Bilel Ben Salah
31	GK	SWE	Albin Gustafsson
77	DF	SWE	Isak Arvidsson Najhi
80	MF	SWE	Theo Forsman
99	MF	SWE	Mohamad Suleiman
