= 2013 Djurgårdens IF season =

Djurgården
2013 season
- Chairman: Tommy Jacobson
- Manager: Magnus Pehrsson (sacked); Anders Johansson & Martin Sundgren (caretakers); Per-Mathias Høgmo
- Stadium: Stockholms Stadion (to 30 June); Tele2 Arena (from 21 July)
- Allsvenskan: 7th
- Svenska Cupen: Runners-up
- Top goalscorer: League: Amadou Jawo (12); All: Amadou Jawo (13)
- Highest home attendance: 27,798 (21 July vs IFK Norrköping, Allsvenskan)
- Lowest home attendance: 1,840 (3 March vs Umeå FC, Svenska Cupen)
- Average home league attendance: 12,475
Home colours	Away colours

In the 2013 season, Djurgårdens IF competes in the Allsvenskan and Svenska Cupen. Magnus Pehrsson is managing the team for the third year. In July, the team will move to the newly built Tele2 Arena.

== Squad information ==
=== Squad ===
- updated April 4, 2013

N	Pos.	Nat.	Name	Age	EU	Since	App	Goals	Ends	Transfer fee	Notes
3	CB	(Denmark)	Marc Pedersen	37	EU	2012	10	1	2013	Undisclosed	
4	CM	(Ghana)	Yussif Chibsah	42	Non-EU	2012	23	0	2014	Undisclosed	
5	LB	(Sweden)	Petter Gustafsson	41	EU	2009	98	5	2013	Undisclosed	
6	MF	(Denmark)	Peter Nymann	44	EU	2011	41	3	2013	Undisclosed	
7	MF	(Sweden)	Martin Broberg	36	EU	2012	9	0	2015	Undisclosed	
8	CM	(Sweden)	Andreas Johansson	48	EU	2012	124	45	2014	Free	
9	CF	(Argentina)	Luis Solignac	35	Non-EU	2012	0	0	2013	Loan	
10	CF	(Kosovo)	Erton Fejzullahu	38	EU	2012	13	7	2016	Undisclosed	
11	CF	(Sweden)	Amadou Jawo	42	EU	2013	0	0	2013	Loan	
12	GK	(Norway)	Kenneth Høie	47	EU	2012	13	0	2014	Undisclosed	
13	CB	(Sweden)	Emil Bergström	33	EU	2011	41	1	2014	Youth system	
14	CB	(Sweden)	Mattias Östberg	49	EU	2012	2	0	2013	Undisclosed	
15	MF	(United States)	Brian Span	34	Non-EU	2012	9	1	2013	Free	
16	MF	(Brazil)	Pablo Dyego	32	Non-EU	2013	0	0	2014	Loan	
17	DF	(Sweden)	Joel Riddez	46	EU	2011	56	1	2013	Free	
18	MF	(Ghana)	Daniel Amartey	31	Non-EU	2013	0	0	2017	Free	
19	MF	(Sweden)	Nahir Oyal	35	EU	2012	9	0	2015	Free	
20	MF	(Sweden)	Simon Tibbling	32	EU	2011	15	1	2016	Youth system	
23	GK	(Sweden)	Hampus Nilsson	36	EU	2013	0	0	2014	Free	
24	CB	(Sweden)	Daniel Jarl	34	EU	2010	2	0	2013	Undisclosed	
26	LB	(Sweden)	Jesper Arvidsson	41	EU	2013	0	0	2015	Free	
27	CF	(Ghana)	Godsway Donyoh	32	Non-EU	2013	0	0	2013	Loan	
30	GK	(Sweden)	Eric Dahlgren	32	EU	2013	0	0	2014	Youth system	
32	AM	(Sweden)	Tim Söderström	32	EU	2011	0	0	2014	Youth system	
36	RB	(Sweden)	Philip Sparrdal Mantilla	33	EU	2008	2	0	2013	Youth system	
TBA	CB	(Lithuania)	Vytautas Andriuškevičius	36	EU	2013	0	0	2013	Undisclosed	

=== Transfers ===
==== In ====
No.	Pos.	Nat.	Name	Age	EU	Moving from	Type	Transfer window	Ends	Transfer fee	Source
26	LB	(Sweden)	Jesper Arvidsson	27	EU	Åtvidabergs FF	End of contract	Winter	2015	Free	
8	MF	(Sweden)	Andreas Johansson	34	EU	OB (Denmark)	End of contract	Winter	2014	Free	
23	GK	(Sweden)	Hampus Nilsson	22	EU	Ängelholms FF	End of contract	Winter	2014	Free	
18	MF	(Ghana)	Daniel Amartey	18	EU		End of contract	Winter	Unknown	Free	
TBA	DF	(Lithuania)	Vytautas Andriuškevičius	22	EU	Lechia Gdańsk	End of contract	Winter	2013	Undisclosed	

==== Out ====
No.	Pos.	Nat.	Name	Age	EU	Moving to	Type	Transfer window	Transfer fee	Source
11	MF	(Finland)	Daniel Sjölund	29	EU	Åtvidabergs FF	End of contract	Winter	Free	
16	MF	(Finland)	Kasper Hämäläinen	26	EU	Lech Poznań (Poland)	Transfer	Winter	Undisclosed	
20	LB	(Sweden)	Andreas Dahlén	29	EU	Åtvidabergs FF	End of contract	Winter	Free	
27	CF	(Nigeria)	Kennedy Igboananike	23	Non-EU	AIK	End of contract	Winter	Free	
2	DF	(Finland)	Joona Toivio	25	EU	Molde	Transfer	Winter	Undisclosed	

==== Loans in ====
No.	Pos.	Nat.	Name	Age	EU	Moving from	Type	Transfer window	Ends	Transfer fee	Source
9	CF	(Argentina)	Luis Solignac	21	Non-EU	Platense (Honduras)	Loan	Winter	2013	N/A	
27	CF	(Ghana)	Godsway Donyoh	18	Non-EU	Manchester City (England)	Loan	Winter	2013	N/A	
11	CF	(Sweden)	Amadou Jawo	28	EU	IF Elfsborg	Loan	Winter	2013	N/A	
16	AM	(Brazil)	Pablo Dyego	19	EU	Fluminense (Brazil)	Loan	Winter	2014	N/A	

==== Loans out ====
No.	Pos.	Nat.	Name	Age	EU	Moving to	Type	Transfer window	Transfer fee	Source
22	AM	(Sweden)	Philip Hellquist	21	EU	Assyriska Föreningen	Loan	Winter	N/A	
28	CF	(Sierra Leone)	Alhaji Kamara	18	Non-EU	IK Frej	Loan	Winter	N/A	
33	AM	(Serbia)	Sasa Matic	19	EU	Syrianska Botkyrka IF	Loan	Winter	N/A	
34	AM	(Sweden)	Kristijan Cosic	18	EU	Syrianska Botkyrka IF	Loan	Winter	N/A	
35	DF	(Sweden)	Adam Kasa	19	EU	IK Frej	Loan	Winter	N/A	
38	CF	(Sweden)	Trimi Makolli	21	EU	IK Frej	Loan	Winter	N/A	
25	AM	(Sweden)	Sebastian Rajalakso	24	EU	Syrianska FC	Loan	Winter	N/A	
29	AM	(Sierra Leone)	Ibrahim Fofana	19	Non-EU	Syrianska Botkyrka IF	Loan	Winter	N/A	

== Player statistics ==
Appearances for competitive matches only

No.	Pos	Nat	Player	Total		Allsvenskan		2012–13 Svenska Cupen 2013–14 Svenska Cupen	
No.	Pos	Nat	Player	Apps	Goals	Apps	Goals	Apps	Goals
2	DF	(Finland) FIN	Joona Toivio	1	0	0	0	1	0
3	DF	(Denmark) DEN	Marc Pedersen	9	0	7	0	2	0
4	MF	(Ghana) GHA	Yussif Chibsah	31	0	24	0	7	0
5	MF	(Sweden) SWE	Petter Gustafsson	16	0	16	0	0	0
6	DF	(Denmark) DEN	Peter Nymann	34	0	29	0	5	0
7	MF	(Sweden) SWE	Martin Broberg	27	1	24	1	3	0
8	MF	(Sweden) SWE	Andreas Johansson	34	6	27	4	7	2
9	FW	(Argentina) ARG	Luis Solignac	19	2	14	1	5	1
10	FW	(Sweden) SWE	Erton Fejzullahu	33	12	26	7	7	5
11	FW	(Sweden) SWE	Amadou Jawo	31	13	26	12	5	1
12	GK	(Norway) NOR	Kenneth Høie	36	0	30	0	6	0
13	DF	(Sweden) SWE	Emil Bergström	34	2	29	2	5	0
14	DF	(Sweden) SWE	Mattias Östberg	25	1	19	1	6	0
15	MF	(United States) USA	Brian Span	10	0	5	0	5	0
16	MF	(Brazil) BRA	Pablo Dyego	1	0	1	0	0	0
17	DF	(Sweden) SWE	Joel Riddez	2	0	2	0	0	0
18	DF	(Ghana) GHA	Daniel Amartey	29	1	23	0	6	1
19	MF	(Sweden) SWE	Nahir Oyal	10	1	5	0	5	1
20	MF	(Sweden) SWE	Simon Tibbling	32	1	28	1	4	0
21	FW	(Ghana) GHA	Godsway Donyoh	23	2	20	2	3	0
22	MF	(Sweden) SWE	Haris Radetinac	11	1	10	1	1	0
23	GK	(Sweden) SWE	Hampus Nilsson	1	0	0	0	1	0
24	DF	(Sweden) SWE	Daniel Jarl	0	0	0	0	0	0
26	DF	(Sweden) SWE	Jesper Arvidsson	22	0	15	0	7	0
27	DF	(Lithuania) LTU	Vytautas Andriuškevičius	17	0	16	0	1	0
28	FW	(Switzerland) SUI	Aleksandar Prijović	11	5	10	5	1	0
30	GK	(Sweden) SWE	Eric Dahlgren	0	0	0	0	0	0
32	MF	(Sweden) SWE	Tim Söderström	2	0	2	0	0	0
36	DF	(Sweden) SWE	Philip Sparrdal Mantilla	3	0	2	0	1	0

=== Total ===
Name	Goals
(Sweden) Amadou Jawo	13
(Sweden) Erton Fejzullahu	12
(Sweden) Andreas Johansson	6
(Switzerland) Aleksandar Prijović	5
(Sweden) Emil Bergström	2
(Ghana) Godsway Donyoh	2
(Argentina) Luis Solignac	2
(Ghana) Daniel Amartey	1
(Sweden) Martin Broberg	1
(Sweden) Mattias Östberg	1
(Sweden) Nahir Oyal	1
(Bosnia and Herzegovina) Haris Radetinac	1
(Sweden) Simon Tibbling	1

==== Allsvenskan ====
Name	Goals
(Sweden) Amadou Jawo	12
(Sweden) Erton Fejzullahu	7
(Switzerland) Aleksandar Prijović	5
(Sweden) Andreas Johansson	4
(Sweden) Emil Bergström	2
(Ghana) Godsway Donyoh	2
(Sweden) Martin Broberg	1
(Sweden) Mattias Östberg	1
(Bosnia and Herzegovina) Haris Radetinac	1
(Argentina) Luis Solignac	1
(Sweden) Simon Tibbling	1

==== Svenska Cupen ====
Name	Goals
(Sweden) Erton Fejzullahu	5
(Sweden) Andreas Johansson	2
(Sweden) Daniel Amartey	1
(Sweden) Amadou Jawo	1
(Argentina) Luis Solignac	1
(Sweden) Nahir Oyal	1

== Competitions ==
=== Overall ===
Competition	Started round	Current position / round	Final position / round	First match	Last match
Allsvenskan	N/A	—	7th	1 April 2013	3 November 2013
Svenska Cupen	Round 2	—	Runner up	20 August 2012	26 May 2013

Source: Competitions

=== Allsvenskan ===
==== League table ====
Pos	Team	Pld	W	D	L	GF	GA	GD	Pts	Qualification or relegation
5	Helsingborgs IF	30	14	7	9	61	41	+20	49	
6	IF Elfsborg	30	12	10	8	49	34	+15	46	Qualification to Europa League second qualifying round (Note: IF Elfsborg qualified for the 2014–15 UEFA Europa League second qualifying round by winning the 2013–14 Svenska Cupen.)
7	Djurgårdens IF	30	12	8	10	38	44	−6	44	
8	Åtvidabergs FF	30	11	7	12	37	37	0	40	
9	IFK Norrköping	30	11	6	13	45	47	−2	39	

Source: svenskfotboll.se (in Swedish)
Rules for classification: 1) points; 2) goal difference; 3) number of goals scored.

==== Matches ====
Kickoff times are in UTC+2 unless stated otherwise.

31 March 2013 1	Helsingborgs IF	3–0	Djurgårdens IF	Helsingborg
17:30	Lindström 4'; Accam 31', 34'	Report		Stadium: Olympia; Attendance: 11,201; Referee: Markus Strömbergsson

8 April 2013 2	Djurgårdens IF	0–3	Mjällby AIF	Stockholm
19:00		Report	Strömberg 37'	Stadium: Stockholm Olympic Stadium; Referee: Tobias Mattsson

14 April 2013 3	BK Häcken	4–0	Djurgårdens IF	Gothenburg
17:30	Makondele 13'; Ericsson 45'; El Kabir 46', 57'	Report		Stadium: Rambergsvallen; Attendance: 3,064; Referee: Michael Lerjeus

18 April 2013 4	Djurgårdens IF	1–1	IF Brommapojkarna	Stockholm
19:00	Jawo 26'	Report	Eriksson 82'	Stadium: Stockholm Olympic Stadium; Attendance: 6,798; Referee: Martin Strömbergsson

22 April 2013 5	IF Elfsborg	2–0	Djurgårdens IF	Borås
19:00	Nilsson 53' (pen.); Ishizaki 56'	Report		Stadium: Borås Arena; Attendance: 9,476; Referee: Stefan Johannesson

27 April 2013 6	Djurgårdens IF	0–1	Syrianska FC	Stockholm
16:00		Report	Kunić 78'	Stadium: Stockholm Olympic Stadium; Attendance: 7,383; Referee: Martin Hansson

4 May 2013 7	Åtvidaberg	5–1	Djurgårdens IF	Åtvidaberg
16:00	Zatara 19', 61'; Prodell 36', 63'; Pettersson 48'	Report	Jawo 81'	Stadium: Kopparvallen; Attendance: 6,152; Referee: Andreas Ekberg

12 May 2013 8	Djurgårdens IF	3–2	Malmö FF	Stockholm
17:30	Johansson 10'; Solignac 76'; Östberg 88'	Report	Rantie 1'; Eriksson 43'	Stadium: Stockholm Olympic Stadium; Attendance: 7,492; Referee: Bojan Pandzic

19 May 2013 9	Djurgårdens IF	1–0	Halmstads BK	Stockholm
17:30	Fejzullahu 54'	Report		Stadium: Stockholm Olympic Stadium; Attendance: 7,021; Referee: Johan Hamlin

22 May 2013 10	AIK	1–1	Djurgårdens IF	Solna
				Stadium: Friends Arena

30 May 2013 11	Djurgårdens IF	1–0	Kalmar FF	Stockholm
				Stadium: Stockholm Olympic Stadium

17 June 2013 12	IFK Göteborg	0–0	Djurgårdens IF	Gothenburg
				Stadium: Gamla Ullevi

24 June 2013 14	Gefle IF	1–1	Djurgårdens IF	Gävle
				Stadium: Strömvallen

30 June 2013 13	Djurgårdens IF	2–0	Östers IF	Stockholm
				Stadium: Stockholm Olympic Stadium

14 July 2013 16	Mjällby AIF	2–0	Djurgårdens IF	Hällevik
				Stadium: Strandvallen

21 July 2013 17	Djurgårdens IF	1–2	IFK Norrköping	Stockholm
				Stadium: Tele2 Arena; Attendance: 27,798

5 August 2013 18	Djurgårdens IF	2–1	Helsingborgs IF	Stockholm
				Stadium: Tele2 Arena

10 August 2013 19	IF Brommapojkarna	3–0	Djurgårdens IF	Stockholm
				Stadium: Tele2 Arena

18 August 2013 20	Djurgårdens IF	1–1	BK Häcken	Stockholm
				Stadium: Tele2 Arena

22 August 2013 15	IFK Norrköping	2–3	Djurgårdens IF	Norrköping
				Stadium: Nya Parken

26 August 2013 21	Syrianska FC	1–3	Djurgårdens IF	Södertälje
				Stadium: Södertälje Fotbollsarena

1 September 2013 22	Djurgårdens IF	1–2	IF Elfsborg	Stockholm
				Stadium: Tele2 Arena

16 September 2013 23	Malmö FF	0–2	Djurgårdens IF	Malmö
19:05		Report	Jawo 5', 50'	Stadium: Swedbank Stadion; Attendance: 15,751; Referee: Michael Lerjéus

22 September 2013 24	Djurgårdens IF	2–0	Åtvidabergs FF	Stockholm
				Stadium: Tele2 Arena

26 September 2013 25	Djurgårdens IF	2–2	AIK	Stockholm
				Stadium: Tele2 Arena; Attendance: 27,112

29 September 2013 26	Halmstads BK	1–4	Djurgårdens IF	Halmstad
				Stadium: Örjans Vall

6 October 2013 27	Djurgårdens IF	2–1	IFK Göteborg	Stockholm
15:00	Broberg 50'; Jawo 90+6' (pen.)	Report	Johansson 45'	Stadium: Tele2 Arena; Attendance: 11,815; Referee: Stefan Johannesson

21 October 2013 28	Kalmar FF	1–2	Djurgårdens IF	Kalmar
19:00	Elm 2'	Report	Fejzullahu 38'; Prijović 53'	Stadium: Guldfågeln Arena; Attendance: 4,011; Referee: Michael Lerjéus

27 October 2013 29	Djurgårdens IF	1–1	Gefle IF	Stockholm
15:00	Jawo 41'	Report	Oremo 6'	Stadium: Tele2 Arena; Attendance: 14,885; Referee: Glenn Nyberg

3 November 2013 30	Östers IF	1–1	Djurgårdens IF	Växjö
15:00	Piñones Arce 9'	Report	Fejzullahu 62'	Stadium: Myresjöhus Arena; Attendance: 3,847; Referee: Anders Ekberg

=== 2012–13 Svenska Cupen ===
==== Group stage ====
Pos	Team	Pld	W	D	L	GF	GA	GD	Pts	Qualification	DIF	ÅFF	JSIF	UFC
1	Djurgårdens IF	3	2	1	0	7	2	+5	7	Advance to Knockout stage	—	—	3–1	3–0
2	Åtvidabergs FF	3	1	1	1	5	4	+1	4		1–1	—	3–1	—
3	Jönköpings Södra IF	3	1	0	2	5	6	−1	3		—	—	—	3–0
4	Umeå FC	3	1	0	2	2	7	−5	3		—	2–1	—	—

3 March 2013 Matchday 1	Djurgårdens IF	3 – 0	Umeå FC	Stockholm
15:00	Fejzullahu 34' (pen.), 60' (pen.), 67'			Stadium: Grimsta IP; Attendance: 1,840; Referee: Markus Strömbergsson (Gävle)

10 March 2013 Matchday 2	Djurgårdens IF	3 – 1	Jönköpings Södra IF	Stockholm
17:00	Johansson 53'; Solignac 66'; Fejzullahu 79'	Report	Thelin 74'	Stadium: Grimsta IP; Referee: Mohammed Al-Hakim (Köping)

17 March 2013 Matchday 3	Åtvidabergs FF	1 – 1	Djurgårdens IF	Åtvidaberg
16:00	Prodell 20'	Report	Oyal 52'	Stadium: Kopparvallen; Attendance: 1,453; Referee: Jonas Eriksson (Stockholm)

==== Knockout stage ====
Quarter-finals
4 April – Norrköping
IFK Norrköping	0 (4)
Djurgårdens IF (p)	0 (5)
3 April – Växjö
Falkenbergs FF	0
Örgryte IS	1
4 April – Växjö
Östers IF	2
IK Sirius	1
3 April – Helsingborg
Helsingborgs IF	0
IFK Göteborg	1

Semi-finals
1 May – Stockholm
Djurgårdens IF	1
Örgryte IS	0
1 May – Växjö
Östers IF	1
IFK Göteborg	4

Final
26 May – Solna
Djurgårdens IF	1 (1)
IFK Göteborg (p)	1 (3)

4 April 2013 Quarter-final	IFK Norrköping	0 – 0 (a.e.t.) (4 – 5 p)	Djurgårdens IF	Norrköping
17:30		Report		Stadium: Idrottsparken; Attendance: 2,306; Referee: Martin Strömbergsson (Gävle)
	Penalties
	Þorvaldsson (penalty scored); Telo (penalty scored); Gerson (penalty scored); Thelin (penalty scored); Luts (penalty missed)		(penalty scored) Johansson; (penalty scored) Fejzullahu; (penalty scored) Jawo; (penalty scored) Oyal; (penalty scored) Arvidsson

1 May 2013 Semi-final	Djurgårdens IF	1 – 0	Örgryte IS	Stockholm
13:30	Johansson 59'	Report		Stadium: Stockholm Stadion; Attendance: 7,126; Referee: Martin Strömbergsson (Gävle)

26 May 2013 Final	Djurgårdens IF	1 – 1 (a.e.t.) (1 – 3 p)	IFK Göteborg	Solna
17:00 UTC+2	Amartey 52'	Report	Hysén 6'	Stadium: Friends Arena; Attendance: 21,819; Referee: Stefan Johannesson (Täby)
	Penalties
	Jawo (penalty missed); Johansson (penalty scored); Solignac (penalty missed); Nymann (penalty missed)		(penalty scored) Haglund; (penalty missed) Bjärsmyr; (penalty scored) Dyrestam; (penalty scored) Farnerud

=== 2013–14 Svenska Cupen ===
==== Preliminary rounds ====
11 September 2013 Round 2	Eskilsminne IF	0 – 2	Djurgårdens IF	Helsingborg
19:00		Report	Jawo 65'; Fejzullahu 78'	Stadium: Harlyckans IP; Attendance: 3,011; Referee: Robert Daradić (Helsingborg)

=== Friendlies ===
19 January 2013	Djurgårdens IF (Sweden)	1 – 1	(Sweden) IK Frej	Stockholm
13:00	90' Söderström	Report	87' Stenberg	Stadium: Johan Björkmans Hall; Attendance: -

30 January 2013	Syrianska FC (Sweden)	1 – 1	(Sweden) Djurgårdens IF	Södertälje
15:00	22' (pen.) Kunic	Report	31' Fejzullahu	Stadium: Södertälje Sportarena

2 February 2013	Gefle IF (Sweden)	1 – 2	(Sweden) Djurgårdens IF	Gävle
13:00	89' Törnros	Report	4' Johansson; 67' Oyal	Stadium: Strömvallen

8 February 2013	Djurgårdens IF (Sweden)	0 – 2	(Sweden) Örebro SK	Stockholm
16:45		Report	(xx) Hasani (xx) Kamara	Stadium: Stadshagen; Attendance: 1500

9 February 2013	Djurgårdens IF (Sweden)	1 – 1	(Sweden) Östers IF	Stockholm
15:15	52' Fejzullahu	Report	87' Birgersson	Stadium: Stadshagen; Attendance: 1000

14 February 2013	FC Lahti (Finland)	2 – 3	(Sweden) Djurgårdens IF	Helsinki
20:00	6' (pen.) Rafael; 81' Hertsi	Report	26' Hellquist; 30' Span; 76' (pen.) Hellquist

16 February 2013	HJK (Finland)	2 – 2	(Sweden) Djurgårdens IF	Helsinki
13:30	36' Heikkilä; 40' Forssell	Report	6' Span; 69' Fejzullahu

20 February 2013	IFK Norrköping (Sweden)	2 – 1	(Sweden) Djurgårdens IF	Norrköping
18:30	70' Smedberg-Dalence; 90' Krogh Gerson	Report	82' Solignac	Stadium: Nya Idrottsparken

23 March 2013	Djurgårdens IF (Sweden)	3 – 1	(Sweden) Kalmar FF	Stockholm
13:00	15' Jawo; 75' Oyal; 90' Donyoh	Report	30' Israelsson	Stadium: Stadshagen; Attendance: 1000
