= 2012 Djurgårdens IF season =

Djurgården
2012 season
- Chairman: Tommy Jacobson
- Manager: Magnus Pehrsson
- Stadium: Stockholms Stadion
- Allsvenskan: 9th
- Top goalscorer: League: Erton Fejzullahu (7); All: Erton Fejzullahu (9)
- Highest home attendance: 30,857 (16 September vs AIK, Allsvenskan)
- Lowest home attendance: 5,112 (1 October vs Mjällby AIF, Allsvenskan)
Home colours	Away colours

In the 2012 season, Djurgårdens IF competes in the Allsvenskan and Svenska Cupen. Magnus Pehrsson is managing the team for the second year.

== Players statistics ==
Appearances for competitive matches only

No.	Pos	Nat	Player	Total		Allsvenskan		Svenska Cupen	
No.	Pos	Nat	Player	Apps	Goals	Apps	Goals	Apps	Goals
2		(Finland) FIN	Joona Toivio	31	2	30	2	1	0
3		(Denmark) DEN	Marc Pedersen	10	1	10	1	0	0
4		(Ghana) GHA	Yussif Chibsah	23	0	23	0	0	0
5		(Sweden) SWE	Petter Gustafsson	29	2	28	2	1	0
6		(Denmark) DEN	Peter Nymann	30	3	29	2	1	1
7		(Sweden) SWE	Martin Broberg	9	0	9	0	0	0
8		(England) ENG	James Keene	27	6	26	6	1	0
9		(Brazil) BRA	Ricardo Santos	14	3	14	3	0	0
10		(Sweden) SWE	Christer Youssef	6	1	6	1	0	0
10		(Kosovo) KOS	Erton Fejzullahu	14	9	13	7	1	2
11		(Finland) FIN	Daniel Sjölund	28	3	27	3	1	0
12		(Norway) NOR	Kenneth Høie	14	0	13	0	1	0
13		(Sweden) SWE	Emil Bergström	24	1	23	1	1	0
14		(Sweden) SWE	Kebba Ceesay	13	0	13	0	0	0
14		(Sweden) SWE	Mattias Östberg	3	0	2	0	1	0
15		(United States) USA	Brian Span	9	1	9	1	0	0
16		(Sweden) SWE	Kasper Hämäläinen	31	6	30	4	1	2
17		(Sweden) SWE	Joel Riddez	2	0	2	0	0	0
19		(Sweden) SWE	Nahir Oyal	9	0	9	0	0	0
20		(Sweden) SWE	Andreas Dahlén	19	0	19	0	0	0
21		(Denmark) DEN	Kasper Jensen	5	0	5	0	0	0
22		(Sweden) SWE	Philip Hellquist	12	1	11	1	1	0
23		(Sweden) SWE	Tommi Vaiho	12	0	12	0	0	0
24		(Sweden) SWE	Daniel Jarl	1	0	1	0	0	0
25		(Sweden) SWE	Sebastian Rajalakso	24	2	24	2	0	0
26		(Sweden) SWE	Philip Sparrdal Mantilla	2	0	1	0	1	0
27		(Nigeria) NGR	Kennedy Igboananike	5	0	5	0	0	0
28		(Sierra Leone) SLE	Alhaji Kamara	6	0	5	0	1	0
31		(Sweden) SWE	Simon Tibbling	16	1	15	1	1	0

== Competitions ==
=== League table ===
Pos	Team	Pld	W	D	L	GF	GA	GD	Pts	Qualification or relegation
7	IFK Göteborg	30	9	12	9	36	41	−5	39	Qualification to Europa League second qualifying round (Note: IFK Göteborg qualified for the 2013–14 UEFA Europa League second qualifying round by winning the 2012–13 Svenska Cupen.)
8	Åtvidabergs FF	30	9	10	11	48	48	0	37	
9	Djurgårdens IF	30	8	13	9	37	40	−3	37	
10	Kalmar FF	30	10	7	13	36	45	−9	37	
11	Gefle IF	30	9	9	12	26	37	−11	36	Qualification to Europa League first qualifying round (Note: Sweden was among the best three associations in the UEFA Fair Play ranking and thus received an additional spot in the first qualifying round of the Europa League, Gefle IF received the qualifying spot for their ranking in Allsvenskans Fair Play ranking.)

Source: svenskfotboll.se (in Swedish)
Rules for classification: 1) points; 2) goal difference; 3) number of goals scored.

==== Matches ====
31 March 2012 Match 1	IF Elfsborg	2 – 1	Djurgårdens IF	Borås
16:00	Svensson 24', 45'	Summary	Pedersen 66'	Stadium: Borås Arena; Attendance: 13,673; Referee: Martin Hansson

8 April 2012 Match 2	Djurgårdens IF	1 – 0	GIF Sundsvall	Stockholm
15:00	Rajalakso 4'	Summary		Stadium: Stockholm Olympic Stadium; Attendance: 11,742; Referee: Daniel Stalhammar

11 April 2012 Match 3	GAIS	0 – 0	Djurgårdens IF	Gothenburg
19:00		Summary		Stadium: Gamla Ullevi; Attendance: 4,470; Referee: Martin Strömbergsson

16 April 2012 Match 4	Djurgårdens IF	2 – 3	Malmö FF	Stockholm
19:00	Keene 54'; Hämäläinen 64'	Summary	Wílton Figueiredo 13'; Hamad 33'; Ranégie 88'	Stadium: Stockholm Olympic Stadium; Attendance: 9,582; Referee: Martin Hansson

20 April 2012 Match 5	Mjällby AIF	4 – 3	Djurgårdens IF	Hällevik
19:00	Ericsson 10', 34'; Ekenberg 26'; Kivuvu 36'	Summary	Keene 42'; Toivio 59'; Hämäläinen 89'	Stadium: Strandvallen; Attendance: 3,022; Referee: Andreas Ekberg

29 April 2012 Match 6	Djurgårdens IF	1 – 1	Kalmar FF	Stockholm
15:00	Hämäläinen 3'	Summary	Daniel Mendes 22'	Stadium: Stockholm Olympic Stadium; Attendance: 8,712; Referee: Martin Strömbergsson

3 May 2012 Match 7	Djurgårdens IF	2 – 1	Örebro SK	Stockholm
19:00	Keene 47'; Fejzullahu 62'	Summary	Rama 37' (pen.)	Stadium: Stockholm Olympic Stadium; Attendance: 6,587; Referee: Johan Hamlin

8 May 2012 Match 8	AIK	1 – 1	Djurgårdens IF	Stockholm
19:00	Pedersen 89' (o.g.)	Summary	Gustafsson 58'	Stadium: Råsunda Stadium; Attendance: 27,112; Referee: Stefan Johannesson

12 May 2012 Match 9	Djurgårdens IF	1 – 1	Åtvidabergs FF	Stockholm
16:00	Ricardo Santos 79'	Summary	Zhubi 86'	Stadium: Stockholm Olympic Stadium; Attendance: 7,305; Referee: Tobias Mattsson

17 May 2012 Match 10	Djurgårdens IF	1 – 1	Gefle IF	Stockholm
17:30	Ricardo Santos 36'	Summary	Broberg 18' (o.g.)	Stadium: Stockholm Olympic Stadium; Attendance: 7,138; Referee: Jonas Eriksson

20 May 2012 Match 11	BK Häcken	1 – 1	Djurgårdens IF	Gothenburg
15:00	Makondele 72'	Summary	Ricardo Santos 58'	Stadium: Rambergsvallen; Attendance: 3,422; Referee: Johan Hamlin

23 May 2012 Match 12	Helsingborgs IF	1 – 1	Djurgårdens IF	Helsingborg
19:00	Nordmark 1'	Summary	Span 74'	Stadium: Olympia; Attendance: 9,861; Referee: Michael Lerjeus

3 July 2012 Match 13	Djurgårdens IF	3 – 2	IFK Göteborg	Stockholm
19:00	Keene 29', 56'; Sjölund 51'<	Summary	Daniel Sobralense 21'; Hysén 72'	Stadium: Stockholm Olympic Stadium; Attendance: 10,115; Referee: Michael Lerjeus

7 July 2012 Match 14	Syrianska FC	1 – 1	Djurgårdens IF	Södertälje
16:00	Mourad 32'	Summary	Keene 51'	Stadium: Södertälje Fotbollsarena; Attendance: 4,941; Referee: Andreas Ekberg

16 July 2012 Match 15	Djurgårdens IF	1 – 1	IFK Norrköping	Stockholm
19:00	Sjölund 31'	Summary	Nyman 84'	Stadium: Stockholm Olympic Stadium; Attendance: 9,043; Referee: Johan Hamlin

23 July 2012 Match 16	IFK Norrköping	1 – 1	Djurgårdens IF	Norrköping
19:00	Khalili 80'	Summary	Nymann 28'	Stadium: Idrottsparken; Attendance: 10,329; Referee: Martin Hansson

29 July 2012 Match 17	Djurgårdens IF	0 – 0	IF Elfsborg	Stockholm
18:30		Summary		Stadium: Stockholm Olympic Stadium; Attendance: 7,386; Referee: Stefan Johannesson

6 August 2012 Match 18	GIF Sundsvall	0 – 1	Djurgårdens IF	Sundsvall
19:00		Summary	Sjölund 52'	Stadium: Norrporten Arena; Attendance: 5,629; Referee: Martin Hansson

10 August 2012 Match 19	Gefle IF	0 – 1	Djurgårdens IF	Gävle
19:20		Summary	Fejzullahu 57'	Stadium: Strömvallen; Attendance: 5,053; Referee: Magnus Ahlsèn

25 August 2012 Match 20	Djurgårdens IF	3 – 1	Helsingborgs IF	Stockholm
16:00	Fejzullahu 6', 31', 79'	Summary	Đurđić 25'	Stadium: Stockholm Olympic Stadium; Attendance: 7,363; Referee: Johan Hamlin

31 August 2012 Match 21	Örebro SK	2 – 3	Djurgårdens IF	Örebro
19:15	Holmberg 23'; Wikström 45+2'	Summary	Hämäläinen 11'; Hellquist 21'; Fejzullahu 73'	Stadium: Behrn Arena; Attendance: 6,809; Referee: Magnus Ahlsèn

16 September 2012 Match 22	Djurgårdens IF	0 – 3	AIK	Stockholm
14:30		Summary	Karikari 49'; Bangura 71'; Borges 86'	Stadium: Stockholm Olympic Stadium; Attendance: 30,857; Referee: Jonas Eriksson

21 September 2012 Match 23	Djurgårdens IF	0 – 3	BK Häcken	Stockholm
19:00		Summary	Anklev 35'; Williams 54'; Waris Majeed 81'	Stadium: Stockholm Olympic Stadium; Attendance: 5,594; Referee: Tobias Mattsson

26 September 2012 Match 24	Åtvidabergs FF	2 – 1	Djurgårdens IF	Åtvidaberg
18:00	Bergström 69'; Möller 77'	Summary	Bergström 48'	Stadium: Kopparvallen; Attendance: 4,267; Referee: Magnus Ahlsèn

1 October 2012 Match 25	Djurgårdens IF	0 – 1	Mjällby AIF	Stockholm
19:00		Summary	Ericsson 56'	Stadium: Stockholm Olympic Stadium; Attendance: 5,112; Referee: Johan Hamlin

7 October 2012 Match 26	Kalmar FF	2 – 2	Djurgårdens IF	Kalmar
15:00	McDonald 32'; Skjelvik 35'	Summary	Toivio 15'; Gustafsson 82'	Stadium: Guldfågeln Arena; Attendance: 5,156; Referee: Bojan Pandzic

22 October 2012 Match 27	Djurgårdens IF	3 – 0	GAIS	Stockholm
19:00	Fejzullahu 55', 66'; Tibbling 84'	Summary		Stadium: Stockholm Olympic Stadium; Attendance: 5,569; Referee: Andreas Ekberg

26 October 2012 Match 28	Malmö FF	3 – 1	Djurgårdens IF	Malmö
19:00	Thern 22'; Halsti 53'; Hamad 55'	Summary	Nymann 25'	Stadium: Swedbank Stadion; Attendance: 15,107; Referee: Stefan Johannesson

31 October 2012 Match 29	Djurgårdens IF	1 – 1	Syrianska FC	Stockholm
19:00	Rajalakso 90+4'	Summary	Touma 45+2'	Stadium: Stockholm Olympic Stadium; Attendance: 5,637; Referee: Michael Lerjeus

4 November 2012 Match 30	IFK Göteborg	1 – 0	Djurgårdens IF	Gothenburg
15:00	Selaković 44'	Summary		Stadium: Gamla Ullevi; Attendance: 6,017; Referee: Tobias Mattsson

=== Svenska Cupen ===
20 August 2012 Round 2	Dalstorps IF	1 – 5	Djurgårdens IF	Dalstorp
18:00	Jimmy Arnesson 43' (pen.)	Summary	Fejzullahu 26', 45+1'; Hämäläinen 37', 75'; Nymann 78'	Stadium: Dalshov; Referee: Michael Lerjeus
