= List of Swedish football transfers winter 2014–15 =

This is a list of Swedish football transfers in the winter transfer window 2014–15 by club.

Only transfers in and out between 8 January – 31 March 2015 of the Allsvenskan and Superettan are included.

== Allsvenskan ==
=== AIK ===
In: Note: Flags indicate national team as defined under FIFA eligibility rules; some limited exceptions apply. Players may hold more than one non-FIFA nationality.

No.	Pos.	Nation	Player
7	FW	NOR	Fredrik Brustad (from Stabæk)

Out: Note: Flags indicate national team as defined under FIFA eligibility rules; some limited exceptions apply. Players may hold more than one non-FIFA nationality.

No.	Pos.	Nation	Player
21	FW	NGA	Kennedy Igboananike (to Chicago Fire)
22	MF	CRC	Celso Borges (on loan to Deportivo La Coruña)

=== BK Häcken ===
In: Note: Flags indicate national team as defined under FIFA eligibility rules; some limited exceptions apply. Players may hold more than one non-FIFA nationality.

No.	Pos.	Nation	Player
2	DF	URU	Diego Lugano (from West Bromwich Albion)
—	MF	SWE	Joakim Olausson (from Atalanta B.C.)
—	FW	GHA	Benjamin Fadi (on loan from Malmö FF)

Out: Note: Flags indicate national team as defined under FIFA eligibility rules; some limited exceptions apply. Players may hold more than one non-FIFA nationality.

No.	Pos.	Nation	Player
—	MF	SWE	Oscar Lewicki (to Malmö FF)
—	FW	SWE	Carlos Strandberg (to CSKA Moscow)

=== Djurgårdens IF ===
In: Note: Flags indicate national team as defined under FIFA eligibility rules; some limited exceptions apply. Players may hold more than one non-FIFA nationality.

No.	Pos.	Nation	Player
15	DF	GAM	Omar Colley (from KuPS)
14	DF	SWE	Elliot Käck (from IK Sirius)
17	DF	SWE	Tim Björkström (from IF Brommapojkarna)
8	MF	SWE	Kevin Walker (from GIF Sundsvall)
10	MF	NOR	Daniel Berntsen (from Rosenborg BK) (Note: "Daniel Berntsen till Djurgården".)
20	FW	LBR	Sam Johnson (from IK Frej)
22	MF	SWE	Jesper Karlström (from IF Brommapojkarna) (Note: http://dif.se/2015/01/22/jesper-karlstrom-klar-for-dif/)
18	MF	SWE	Kerim Mrbati (from IK Sirius)
—	MF	KOR	Yoon Soo-yong (from Nike Academy) (Note: "Djurgården kontrakterar Soo Yong Yoon | Djurgården Fotboll".)
—	MF	ZIM	Nyasha Mushekwi (on loan from Mamelodi Sundowns)

Out: Note: Flags indicate national team as defined under FIFA eligibility rules; some limited exceptions apply. Players may hold more than one non-FIFA nationality.

No.	Pos.	Nation	Player
8	MF	SWE	Andreas Johansson (retiring)
14	DF	SWE	Mattias Östberg (free transfer)
10	FW	SWE	Erton Fejzullahu (to Beijing Guoan F.C.)
36	MF	SWE	Philip Sparrdal Mantilla (to IFK Mariehamn)
32	GK	SWE	Eric Dahlgren (free transfer)
20	MF	SWE	Simon Tibbling (to FC Groningen)
—	MF	RSA	Mark Mayambela (free transfer)
—	MF	RSA	Xolani Mdaki (loan return to Mamelodi Sundowns)
—	DF	SWE	Frej Ersa Engberg (on loan to IK Sirius)
—	MF	SWE	Philip Hellquist (to SC Wiener Neustadt)
35	MF	SWE	Christian Rubio Sivodedov (to Schalke 04)
—	MF	SWE	Tim Söderström (on loan to Jönköpings Södra IF) (Note: "Tim Söderström lånas ut till Jönköping Södra | Djurgården Fotboll".)
—	DF	SWE	Kevin Deeromram (on loan to Werder Bremen)
—	DF	SWE	Jakob Glasberg (on loan to IK Frej)
—	MF	SWE	Nahir Oyal (free transfer)

=== Falkenbergs FF ===
In: Note: Flags indicate national team as defined under FIFA eligibility rules; some limited exceptions apply. Players may hold more than one non-FIFA nationality.

No.	Pos.	Nation	Player
17	GK	SWE	Alexander Lundin (from Mjällby AIF)

Out: Note: Flags indicate national team as defined under FIFA eligibility rules; some limited exceptions apply. Players may hold more than one non-FIFA nationality.

No.	Pos.	Nation	Player
—	GK	SWE	Rasmus Rydén (to Östers IF)

=== Gefle IF ===
In: Note: Flags indicate national team as defined under FIFA eligibility rules; some limited exceptions apply. Players may hold more than one non-FIFA nationality.

No.	Pos.	Nation	Player
29	DF	DEN	Martin Rauschenberg (from Stjarnan F.C.)

Out: Note: Flags indicate national team as defined under FIFA eligibility rules; some limited exceptions apply. Players may hold more than one non-FIFA nationality.

No.	Pos.	Nation	Player
19	MF	SWE	Marcus Hansson (to Tromsø)

=== GIF Sundsvall ===
In: Note: Flags indicate national team as defined under FIFA eligibility rules; some limited exceptions apply. Players may hold more than one non-FIFA nationality.

No.	Pos.	Nation	Player

Out: Note: Flags indicate national team as defined under FIFA eligibility rules; some limited exceptions apply. Players may hold more than one non-FIFA nationality.

No.	Pos.	Nation	Player
—	MF	SWE	Johan Lundgren (to GAIS)
—	MF	SWE	Kevin Walker (to Djurgårdens IF)

=== Halmstads BK ===
In: Note: Flags indicate national team as defined under FIFA eligibility rules; some limited exceptions apply. Players may hold more than one non-FIFA nationality.

No.	Pos.	Nation	Player
19	FW	NOR	Snorre Krogsgård (from Odd)

Out: Note: Flags indicate national team as defined under FIFA eligibility rules; some limited exceptions apply. Players may hold more than one non-FIFA nationality.

No.	Pos.	Nation	Player
—	MF	SWE	Oliver Silverholt (to Hammarby IF)
—	MF	ISL	Kristinn Steindórsson (to Columbus Crew)
—	FW	SWE	Mikael Boman (to IFK Göteborg)

=== Hammarby IF ===
In: Note: Flags indicate national team as defined under FIFA eligibility rules; some limited exceptions apply. Players may hold more than one non-FIFA nationality.

No.	Pos.	Nation	Player
18	MF	SWE	Oliver Silverholt (from Halmstads BK)
2	DF	ISL	Birkir Már Sævarsson (from SK Brann)
34	FW	SWE	Måns Söderqvist (from Kalmar FF)
5	MF	SWE	Philip Haglund (from IFK Göteborg)

Out: Note: Flags indicate national team as defined under FIFA eligibility rules; some limited exceptions apply. Players may hold more than one non-FIFA nationality.

No.	Pos.	Nation	Player
—		SWE	Sebastian Ludzik (free transfer)
—	DF	SWE	Daniel Theorin (free transfer)
—	FW	SWE	Andreas Haddad (free transfer)
—		SWE	Nicklas Lindqvist (free transfer)
—	DF	NED	Michael Timisela (free transfer)

=== Helsingborgs IF ===
In: Note: Flags indicate national team as defined under FIFA eligibility rules; some limited exceptions apply. Players may hold more than one non-FIFA nationality.

No.	Pos.	Nation	Player

Out: Note: Flags indicate national team as defined under FIFA eligibility rules; some limited exceptions apply. Players may hold more than one non-FIFA nationality.

No.	Pos.	Nation	Player
—	GK	SWE	Andreas Linde (to Molde)
—	FW	GHA	David Accam (to Chicago Fire)

=== IF Elfsborg ===
In: Note: Flags indicate national team as defined under FIFA eligibility rules; some limited exceptions apply. Players may hold more than one non-FIFA nationality.

No.	Pos.	Nation	Player
2	DF	SWE	Jesper Manns (from Jönköpings Södra IF)
27	DF	SWE	Tom Söderberg (loan return from Sogndal)

Out: Note: Flags indicate national team as defined under FIFA eligibility rules; some limited exceptions apply. Players may hold more than one non-FIFA nationality.

No.	Pos.	Nation	Player
—	FW	SWE	Alibek Aliev (to CSKA Moscow)

=== IFK Göteborg ===
In: Note: Flags indicate national team as defined under FIFA eligibility rules; some limited exceptions apply. Players may hold more than one non-FIFA nationality.

No.	Pos.	Nation	Player
3	DF	USA	Heath Pearce (from Montreal Impact)
4	DF	NOR	Haitam Aleesami (from Fredrikstad)
6	MF	SWE	Sebastian Eriksson (on loan from Cagliari)
8	MF	SWE	Nordin Gerzić (loan return from Örebro SK)
9	MF	DEN	Jakob Ankersen (from Esbjerg fB)
10	MF	BRA	Daniel Sobralense (loan return from Örebro SK)
16	FW	SWE	Mikael Boman (from Halmstads BK)
17	MF	GHA	Kasim Prosper (from International Allies)
20	DF	SWE	Jonathan Azulay (loan return from Östersunds FK)
21	FW	SEN	Malick Mané (loan return from Central Coast Mariners)
24	DF	SWE	Tom Pettersson (from Åtvidabergs FF)
—	DF	NOR	Thomas Rogne (from Wigan Athletic)
—	MF	GHA	Sabah Lawson (from International Allies)

Out: Note: Flags indicate national team as defined under FIFA eligibility rules; some limited exceptions apply. Players may hold more than one non-FIFA nationality.

No.	Pos.	Nation	Player
3	MF	SWE	Hampus Zackrisson (to Degerfors IF)
4	DF	NOR	Kjetil Wæhler (to Vålerenga)
5	MF	SWE	Philip Haglund (to Hammarby IF)
6	DF	SWE	Ludwig Augustinsson (to Copenhagen)
8	MF	SWE	Nordin Gerzić (to Örebro SK)
10	MF	BRA	Daniel Sobralense (to Fortaleza)
15	MF	SWE	Jakob Johansson (to AEK Athens)
16	FW	DEN	Kenneth Zohore (loan return to Fiorentina)
20	DF	SWE	Jonathan Azulay (to Östersunds FK)
21	FW	SEN	Malick Mané (on loan to Hønefoss)
24	MF	CRC	Diego Calvo (loan return to Vålerenga)
25	GK	SWE	Mattias Hugosson (retired)
26	MF	RSA	May Mahlangu (to Konyaspor)
27	MF	SWE	Joel Allansson (to Randers FC)
—	DF	SWE	Linus Dahl (to Ljungskile SK)

=== IFK Norrköping ===
In: Note: Flags indicate national team as defined under FIFA eligibility rules; some limited exceptions apply. Players may hold more than one non-FIFA nationality.

No.	Pos.	Nation	Player

Out: Note: Flags indicate national team as defined under FIFA eligibility rules; some limited exceptions apply. Players may hold more than one non-FIFA nationality.

No.	Pos.	Nation	Player
—	GK	SWE	Andreas Lindberg (to Ranheim)
—	DF	NOR	Edvard Skagestad (to Aalesund)

=== Kalmar FF ===
In: Note: Flags indicate national team as defined under FIFA eligibility rules; some limited exceptions apply. Players may hold more than one non-FIFA nationality.

No.	Pos.	Nation	Player
6	MF	SWE	Rasmus Elm (from CSKA Moscow)

Out: Note: Flags indicate national team as defined under FIFA eligibility rules; some limited exceptions apply. Players may hold more than one non-FIFA nationality.

No.	Pos.	Nation	Player
—	FW	SWE	Måns Söderqvist (to Hammarby IF)

=== Malmö FF ===
In: Note: Flags indicate national team as defined under FIFA eligibility rules; some limited exceptions apply. Players may hold more than one non-FIFA nationality.

No.	Pos.	Nation	Player
6	MF	SWE	Oscar Lewicki (from BK Häcken)
13	DF	PER	Yoshimar Yotún (from Sporting Cristal)
14	MF	SWE	Erik Andersson (from Landskrona BoIS)
17	MF	SWE	Petar Petrović (loan return from Radnički Niš)
19	FW	GHA	Benjamin Fadi (loan return from IFK Värnamo)
19	MF	NOR	Magnus Wolff Eikrem (from Cardiff City)
22	MF	SWE	Tobias Sana (from Ajax)
23	MF	NOR	Jo Inge Berget (from Cardiff City)
26	DF	NOR	Andreas Vindheim (from Brann)
28	FW	SWE	Alexander Nilsson (loan return from Trelleborgs FF)
29	DF	SWE	Tobias Malm (loan return from Östersunds FK)
—	FW	SWE	Petter Thelin (loan return from Skellefteå FF)

Out: Note: Flags indicate national team as defined under FIFA eligibility rules; some limited exceptions apply. Players may hold more than one non-FIFA nationality.

No.	Pos.	Nation	Player
2	DF	SWE	Matias Concha (retired)
6	MF	FIN	Markus Halsti (to D.C. United)
7	FW	SWE	Magnus Eriksson (to Guizhou Renhe)
11	MF	SWE	Simon Thern (to Heerenveen)
16	GK	SWE	Sixten Mohlin (on loan to Västerås SK)
18	DF	SWE	Johan Hammar (on loan to Fredrikstad)
19	FW	GHA	Benjamin Fadi (on loan to Mjällby AIF)
20	DF	BRA	Ricardinho (to Gabala)
22	MF	SWE	Amin Nazari (on loan to Fredrikstad)
24	FW	SWE	Isaac Kiese Thelin (to Bordeaux)
28	FW	SWE	Alexander Nilsson (to Qormi)
29	DF	SWE	Tobias Malm (released)
33	MF	SWE	Emil Forsberg (to RB Leipzig)
34	DF	SWE	Alexander Blomqvist (on loan to IFK Värnamo)
—	FW	SWE	Petter Thelin (on loan to Kramfors-Alliansen)

=== Åtvidabergs FF ===
In: Note: Flags indicate national team as defined under FIFA eligibility rules; some limited exceptions apply. Players may hold more than one non-FIFA nationality.

No.	Pos.	Nation	Player

Out: Note: Flags indicate national team as defined under FIFA eligibility rules; some limited exceptions apply. Players may hold more than one non-FIFA nationality.

No.	Pos.	Nation	Player
—	DF	SWE	Tom Pettersson (to IFK Göteborg)

=== Örebro SK ===
In: Note: Flags indicate national team as defined under FIFA eligibility rules; some limited exceptions apply. Players may hold more than one non-FIFA nationality.

No.	Pos.	Nation	Player
5	DF	ISL	Hjörtur Logi Valgarðsson (from Sogndal)
25	MF	SWE	Nordin Gerzić (from IFK Göteborg)
27	DF	ISL	Eiður Sigurbjörnsson (loan return from Sandnes Ulf)

Out: Note: Flags indicate national team as defined under FIFA eligibility rules; some limited exceptions apply. Players may hold more than one non-FIFA nationality.

No.	Pos.	Nation	Player
27	DF	SWE	Boris Lumbana (to Degerfors)
—	MF	BRA	Daniel Sobralense (loan return to IFK Göteborg)
—	MF	SWE	Nordin Gerzić (loan return to IFK Göteborg)

== Superettan ==
=== AFC United ===
In: Note: Flags indicate national team as defined under FIFA eligibility rules; some limited exceptions apply. Players may hold more than one non-FIFA nationality.

No.	Pos.	Nation	Player
6	DF	SWE	Rabi Elia (from Syrianska)
17	DF	SRB	Danijel Morariju (from Poli Timișoara)
21	MF	MNE	Uroš Delić (from Koper)
27	MF	SWE	Robert Massi (from Syrianska)
58	MF	NED	Othman El Kabir (from Ängelholm)
79	FW	NGA	Chidi Omeje (from Dalkurd)

Out: Note: Flags indicate national team as defined under FIFA eligibility rules; some limited exceptions apply. Players may hold more than one non-FIFA nationality.

No.	Pos.	Nation	Player

=== Assyriska FF ===
In: Note: Flags indicate national team as defined under FIFA eligibility rules; some limited exceptions apply. Players may hold more than one non-FIFA nationality.

No.	Pos.	Nation	Player
4	DF	FIN	Jani Tanska (from FC Lahti)
9	FW	SWE	Andreas Haddad (from Hammarby)
13	DF	SWE	Isa Demir (from Boluspor)
19	FW	ARG	Gustavo Blanco Leschuk (free agent)
20	MF	SWE	Rani Haddad (Promoted)
87	MF	SWE	Christer Youssef (from Aris Limassol)

Out: Note: Flags indicate national team as defined under FIFA eligibility rules; some limited exceptions apply. Players may hold more than one non-FIFA nationality.

No.	Pos.	Nation	Player
—	MF	SWE	Fuad Hyseni (to Degerfors)
—	FW	EST	Kaimar Saag (to Levadia Tallinn)

=== Degerfors IF ===
In: Note: Flags indicate national team as defined under FIFA eligibility rules; some limited exceptions apply. Players may hold more than one non-FIFA nationality.

No.	Pos.	Nation	Player
3	MF	SWE	Hampus Zackrisson (from IFK Göteborg)
7	FW	SWE	Simon Molander (from Carlstad United) (Note: http://nwt.se/sport/fotboll/folj_degerfors/2014/11/06/simon-molander-klar-for-degerfors)
13	DF	SWE	Boris Lumbana (from Örebro)
19	MF	SWE	Fuad Hyseni (from Assyriska) (Note: "Snabb målfarlig ytter DIF-klar".)

Out: Note: Flags indicate national team as defined under FIFA eligibility rules; some limited exceptions apply. Players may hold more than one non-FIFA nationality.

No.	Pos.	Nation	Player

=== GAIS ===
In: Note: Flags indicate national team as defined under FIFA eligibility rules; some limited exceptions apply. Players may hold more than one non-FIFA nationality.

No.	Pos.	Nation	Player
3	DF	SWE	David Björkeryd (from Värnamo)
4	MF	GHA	Yussif Chibsah (from Alanyaspor)
7	MF	SWE	Patrik Ingelsten (from Mjällby)
12	FW	RSA	Pule Maraisane (from Tourizense)
14	MF	ISL	Bragi Bergsson (from ÍBV)
21	MF	SWE	Johan Lundgren (from GIF Sundsvall)

Out: Note: Flags indicate national team as defined under FIFA eligibility rules; some limited exceptions apply. Players may hold more than one non-FIFA nationality.

No.	Pos.	Nation	Player

=== IF Brommapojkarna ===
In: Note: Flags indicate national team as defined under FIFA eligibility rules; some limited exceptions apply. Players may hold more than one non-FIFA nationality.

No.	Pos.	Nation	Player
2	DF	SWE	Fredrik Stoor (from Viborg)
5	DF	SWE	Jonathan Augustinsson (Promoted)
20	GK	SWE	Rasmus Emanuelsson (from Aspudden-Tellus)

Out: Note: Flags indicate national team as defined under FIFA eligibility rules; some limited exceptions apply. Players may hold more than one non-FIFA nationality.

No.	Pos.	Nation	Player
—	DF	SWE	Tim Björkström (to Djurgårdens IF)
—	MF	SWE	Jesper Karlström (to Djurgårdens IF) (Note: http://dif.se/2015/01/22/jesper-karlstrom-klar-for-dif/)

=== IFK Värnamo ===
In: Note: Flags indicate national team as defined under FIFA eligibility rules; some limited exceptions apply. Players may hold more than one non-FIFA nationality.

No.	Pos.	Nation	Player
—	FW	SWE	Petter Thelin (from Malmö FF)

Out: Note: Flags indicate national team as defined under FIFA eligibility rules; some limited exceptions apply. Players may hold more than one non-FIFA nationality.

No.	Pos.	Nation	Player
—	DF	SWE	David Björkeryd (to GAIS)
—	FW	GHA	Benjamin Fadi (loan return to Malmö FF)

=== IK Frej ===
In: Note: Flags indicate national team as defined under FIFA eligibility rules; some limited exceptions apply. Players may hold more than one non-FIFA nationality.

No.	Pos.	Nation	Player
—	DF	SWE	Jakob Glasberg (on loan from Djurgårdens IF)

Out: Note: Flags indicate national team as defined under FIFA eligibility rules; some limited exceptions apply. Players may hold more than one non-FIFA nationality.

No.	Pos.	Nation	Player
—	FW	LBR	Sam Johnson (to Djurgårdens IF)

=== IK Sirius ===
In: Note: Flags indicate national team as defined under FIFA eligibility rules; some limited exceptions apply. Players may hold more than one non-FIFA nationality.

No.	Pos.	Nation	Player
2	DF	SWE	Frej Ersa Engberg (on loan from Djurgårdens IF)

Out: Note: Flags indicate national team as defined under FIFA eligibility rules; some limited exceptions apply. Players may hold more than one non-FIFA nationality.

No.	Pos.	Nation	Player
—	DF	SWE	Elliot Käck (to Djurgårdens IF)
—	MF	SWE	Kerim Mrbati (to Djurgårdens IF)

=== Jönköping Södra IF ===
In: Note: Flags indicate national team as defined under FIFA eligibility rules; some limited exceptions apply. Players may hold more than one non-FIFA nationality.

No.	Pos.	Nation	Player
—	MF	SWE	Tim Söderström (on loan from Djurgårdens IF) (Note: "Tim Söderström lånas ut till Jönköping Södra | Djurgården Fotboll".)

Out: Note: Flags indicate national team as defined under FIFA eligibility rules; some limited exceptions apply. Players may hold more than one non-FIFA nationality.

No.	Pos.	Nation	Player
—	DF	SWE	Jesper Manns (to IFK Göteborg)

=== Ljungskile SK ===
In: Note: Flags indicate national team as defined under FIFA eligibility rules; some limited exceptions apply. Players may hold more than one non-FIFA nationality.

No.	Pos.	Nation	Player

Out: Note: Flags indicate national team as defined under FIFA eligibility rules; some limited exceptions apply. Players may hold more than one non-FIFA nationality.

No.	Pos.	Nation	Player
—	GK	USA	Alex Horwath (to Brann)
—	GK	SWE	Jonathan Rasheed (to Follo)

=== Mjällby AIF ===
In: Note: Flags indicate national team as defined under FIFA eligibility rules; some limited exceptions apply. Players may hold more than one non-FIFA nationality.

No.	Pos.	Nation	Player

Out: Note: Flags indicate national team as defined under FIFA eligibility rules; some limited exceptions apply. Players may hold more than one non-FIFA nationality.

No.	Pos.	Nation	Player
7	FW	SWE	Kristian Haynes (to Trelleborgs FF)
—	GK	SWE	Alexander Lundin (to Falkenbergs FF)
—	MF	SWE	Patrik Ingelsten (to GAIS)

=== Syrianska FC ===
In: Note: Flags indicate national team as defined under FIFA eligibility rules; some limited exceptions apply. Players may hold more than one non-FIFA nationality.

No.	Pos.	Nation	Player

Out: Note: Flags indicate national team as defined under FIFA eligibility rules; some limited exceptions apply. Players may hold more than one non-FIFA nationality.

No.	Pos.	Nation	Player
—	DF	SWE	Rabi Elia (to AFC United)
—	MF	SWE	Robert Massi (to AFC United)

=== Utsiktens BK ===
In: Note: Flags indicate national team as defined under FIFA eligibility rules; some limited exceptions apply. Players may hold more than one non-FIFA nationality.

No.	Pos.	Nation	Player

Out: Note: Flags indicate national team as defined under FIFA eligibility rules; some limited exceptions apply. Players may hold more than one non-FIFA nationality.

No.	Pos.	Nation	Player

=== Varbergs BoIS FC ===
In: Note: Flags indicate national team as defined under FIFA eligibility rules; some limited exceptions apply. Players may hold more than one non-FIFA nationality.

No.	Pos.	Nation	Player
17	MF	NOR	Mats André Kaland (from Hønefoss)

Out: Note: Flags indicate national team as defined under FIFA eligibility rules; some limited exceptions apply. Players may hold more than one non-FIFA nationality.

No.	Pos.	Nation	Player

=== Ängelholms FF ===
In: Note: Flags indicate national team as defined under FIFA eligibility rules; some limited exceptions apply. Players may hold more than one non-FIFA nationality.

No.	Pos.	Nation	Player

Out: Note: Flags indicate national team as defined under FIFA eligibility rules; some limited exceptions apply. Players may hold more than one non-FIFA nationality.

No.	Pos.	Nation	Player
21	MF	NED	Othman El Kabir (to AFC United)

=== Östersunds FK ===
In: Note: Flags indicate national team as defined under FIFA eligibility rules; some limited exceptions apply. Players may hold more than one non-FIFA nationality.

No.	Pos.	Nation	Player
—	DF	SWE	Jonathan Azulay (from IFK Göteborg)

Out: Note: Flags indicate national team as defined under FIFA eligibility rules; some limited exceptions apply. Players may hold more than one non-FIFA nationality.

No.	Pos.	Nation	Player
—	DF	SWE	Tobias Malm (loan return to Malmö FF)
—	DF	SWE	Jonathan Azulay (loan return to IFK Göteborg)
