= 2013 King's Cup squads =

Football tournament squads

The 2013 King's Cup is an international football tournament that will be held in Thailand from 23 to 26 January 2013. The 4 national teams involved in the tournament are required to register a squad of 22 players. Only players in these squads are eligible to take part in the tournament.

== Stage ==
Players' age and caps as of the opening day of the tournament.

=== Sweden ===
Head coach: (Sweden) Erik Hamrén

No.	Pos.	Player	Date of birth (age)	Caps	Goals	Club
1	GK	Pär Hansson	22 June 1986 (aged 26)	2	0	(Swedish Football Association) Helsingborgs IF
12	GK	David Mitov Nilsson	12 January 1991 (aged 22)	0	0	(Swedish Football Association) IFK Norrköping
23	GK	Oscar Jansson	23 December 1990 (aged 22)	0	0	(Football Association of Ireland) Shamrock Rovers
3	DF	Niklas Backman	13 November 1988 (aged 24)	3	0	(Swedish Football Association) AIK
15	DF	Pierre Bengtsson	12 April 1988 (aged 24)	4	0	(Danish Football Association) Copenhagen
5	DF	Erdin Demir	27 March 1990 (aged 22)	2	0	(Norwegian Football Federation) Brann
17	DF	Pontus Jansson	13 February 1991 (aged 21)	2	0	(Swedish Football Association) Malmö FF
4	DF	Adam Johansson	21 February 1983 (aged 29)	12	0	(United States Soccer Federation) Seattle Sounders FC
2	DF	Martin Lorentzson	21 July 1984 (aged 28)	0	0	(Swedish Football Association) AIK
14	DF	Daniel Majstorović	5 April 1977 (aged 35)	48	2	(Swedish Football Association) AIK
13	DF	Alexander Milošević	30 January 1992 (aged 20)	0	0	(Swedish Football Association) AIK
7	MF	Jiloan Hamad	6 November 1990 (aged 22)	4	0	(Swedish Football Association) Malmö FF
6	MF	Jakob Johansson	21 June 1990 (aged 22)	0	0	(Swedish Football Association) IFK Göteborg
19	MF	Ivo Pękalski	3 November 1990 (aged 22)	0	0	(Swedish Football Association) Malmö FF
8	MF	Anders Svensson (captain)	17 July 1976 (aged 36)	135	18	(Swedish Football Association) IF Elfsborg
19	MF	Simon Thern	18 September 1992 (aged 20)	1	1	(Swedish Football Association) Malmö FF
11	FW	Viktor Claesson	2 January 1992 (aged 21)	2	1	(Swedish Football Association) IF Elfsborg
10	FW	Erton Fejzullahu	9 April 1988 (aged 24)	0	0	(Swedish Football Association) Djurgårdens IF
9	FW	Tobias Hysén	9 March 1982 (aged 30)	24	7	(Swedish Football Association) IFK Göteborg
16	FW	Robin Quaison	9 October 1993 (aged 19)	0	0	(Swedish Football Association) AIK
18	FW	Christoffer Nyman	5 October 1992 (aged 20)	0	0	(Swedish Football Association) IFK Norrköping
20	FW	Viktor Prodell	29 December 1988 (aged 24)	0	0	(Swedish Football Association) Åtvidaberg

=== Finland ===
Head coach: (Finland) Mixu Paatelainen

No.	Pos.	Player	Date of birth (age)	Caps	Goals	Club
1	GK	Lukáš Hrádecký	24 November 1989 (aged 23)	12	0	(Danish Football Association) Esbjerg
23	GK	Jesse Joronen	21 March 1990 (aged 22)	0	0	(The Football Association) Fulham
12	GK	Henri Sillanpää	4 June 1979 (aged 33)	5	0	(Football Association of Finland) VPS
14	DF	Paulus Arajuuri	15 June 1988 (aged 24)	3	0	(Swedish Football Association) Kalmar
13	DF	Kari Arkivuo	23 June 1983 (aged 29)	19	1	(Swedish Football Association) Häcken
15	DF	Markus Halsti	19 March 1984 (aged 28)	10	0	(Swedish Football Association) Malmö
2	DF	Jarkko Hurme	4 June 1986 (aged 26)	2	0	(Football Association of Finland) TPS
22	DF	Tuomas Rannankari	21 May 1991 (aged 21)	1	0	(German Football Association) Greuther Fürth
3	DF	Lum Rexhepi	3 August 1992 (aged 20)	0	0	(Football Association of Finland) Honka
5	DF	Mikko Sumusalo	12 March 1990 (aged 22)	1	0	(Football Association of Finland) HJK
4	DF	Joona Toivio (captain)	10 March 1988 (aged 24)	16	1	(Swedish Football Association) Djurgården
21	MF	Kasper Hämäläinen	8 August 1986 (aged 26)	29	6	(Polish Football Association) Lech Poznań
20	MF	Joni Kauko	12 July 1990 (aged 22)	1	0	(Football Association of Finland) Inter Turku
7	MF	Sebastian Mannström	29 October 1988 (aged 24)	3	0	(Football Association of Finland) HJK
16	MF	Mika Ojala	21 June 1988 (aged 24)	5	0	(Swedish Football Association) Häcken
18	MF	Petteri Pennanen	19 September 1990 (aged 22)	0	0	(Football Association of Finland) TPS
17	MF	Roni Porokara	12 December 1983 (aged 29)	22	5	(Football Association of Finland) Honka
11	MF	Riku Riski	16 August 1989 (aged 23)	8	1	(Norwegian Football Federation) Hønefoss
10	MF	Rasmus Schüller	18 June 1991 (aged 21)	0	0	(Football Association of Finland) HJK
8	MF	Teemu Tainio	27 November 1979 (aged 33)	52	6	(Football Association of Finland) HJK
6	MF	Mika Väyrynen	28 December 1981 (aged 31)	57	5	(Football Association of Finland) HJK
9	FW	Mikael Forssell	15 March 1981 (aged 31)	81	26	(Football Association of Finland) HJK

=== Thailand ===
Head coach: (Germany) Winfried Schäfer

No.	Pos.	Player	Date of birth (age)	Caps	Goals	Club
	GK	Sinthaweechai Hathairattanakool	23 March 1982 (aged 30)			(Football Association of Thailand) Chonburi
	GK	Chatchai Budprom	4 February 1987 (aged 25)			(Football Association of Thailand) Osotspa Samut Prakan
	DF	Chonlatit Jantakam	2 June 1985 (aged 27)			(Football Association of Thailand) Chonburi
	DF	Jetsada Jitsawad	5 August 1980 (aged 32)			(Football Association of Thailand) Chiangrai United
	DF	Apiwat Ngaolamhin	1 June 1986 (aged 26)			(Football Association of Thailand) BEC Tero Sasana
	DF	Atit Daosawang	11 November 1992 (aged 20)			(Football Association of Thailand) Muangthong United
	DF	Weerawut Kayem	23 March 1993 (aged 19)			(Football Association of Thailand) Muangthong United
	DF	Narubadin Weerawatnodom	12 July 1994 (aged 18)			(Football Association of Thailand) BEC Tero Sasana
	MF	Adul Lahsoh	19 September 1986 (aged 26)			(Football Association of Thailand) Chonburi
	MF	Datsakorn Thonglao (captain)	30 December 1983 (aged 29)			(Football Association of Thailand) Muangthong United
	MF	Ekaphan Inthasen	23 September 1983 (aged 29)			(Football Association of Thailand) Bangkok Glass
	MF	Sumanya Purisai	5 December 1986 (aged 26)			(Football Association of Thailand) Chainat
	MF	Arthit Sunthornpit	19 April 1986 (aged 26)			(Football Association of Thailand) Chainat
	MF	Thitipan Puangchan	1 September 1993 (aged 19)			(Football Association of Thailand) Muangthong United
	MF	Chanathip Songkrasin	5 October 1993 (aged 19)			(Football Association of Thailand) BEC Tero Sasana
	FW	Kirati Keawsombat	12 January 1987 (aged 26)			(Football Association of Thailand) PTT Rayong
	FW	Tana Chanabut	6 June 1984 (aged 28)			(Football Association of Thailand) Police United
	FW	Surachat Sareepim	24 May 1986 (aged 26)			(Football Association of Thailand) Police United
	FW	Teeratep Winothai	16 February 1985 (aged 27)			(Football Association of Thailand) Bangkok Glass
	FW	Wasan Natasan	2 May 1982 (aged 30)			(Football Association of Thailand) Bangkok Glass
	FW	Chatree Chimtalay	14 December 1983 (aged 29)			(Football Association of Thailand) Bangkok Glass

=== North Korea ===
Head coach: (North Korea) Yun Jong-su
