= Lum Rexhepi =

Kosovan footballer (born 1992)

Personal information
- Full name: Lum Afrim Rexhepi
- Date of birth: 3 August 1992 (age 34)
- Place of birth: Turku, Finland
- Height: 1.92 m (6 ft 4 in)
- Position: Centre-back

Youth career
- –2005: Viikingit
- 2005–2010: HJK Helsinki
- 2010–2011: Klubi 04

Senior career*
Years	Team	Apps	(Gls)
2011–2015	Honka	61	(1)
2012	→ Pallohonka (loan)	1	(0)
2015–2016	Lillestrøm	0	(0)
2016–2017	HJK Helsinki	22	(0)
2017–2018	Go Ahead Eagles	2	(0)
2017–2018	→ Jong Go Ahead Eagles	8	(1)
2018	KuPS	16	(0)
2019	Partizani Tirana	11	(0)
2020	JäPS	8	(3)

International career
2008	Finland U16	6	(0)
2010	Finland U18	7	(2)
2011	Finland U19	2	(0)
2012	Finland U20	2	(0)
2012–2014	Finland U21	5	(0)
2013	Finland	1	(0)
2014–2016	Kosovo	3	(0)
Medal record
Honka
Winner	Finnish League Cup	2011
Winner	Finnish Cup	2012
- * Club domestic league appearances and goals as of 9 April 2019

Lum Afrim Rexhepi (born 3 August 1992) is a professional footballer who most recently played as a centre-back for Finnish club JäPS and the Kosovo national team.

Born in Finland, he represented his place of birth at international level before switching to represent Kosovo in 2014.

== Club career ==
=== Lillestrøm ===
On 27 January 2015, Rexhepi joined Tippeligaen side Lillestrøm, on a one-year contract, but ended up spending almost the whole season injured and his contract was not renewed after the season.

=== Return to HJK Helsinki ===
On 15 January 2016, Rexhepi returned to Veikkausliiga side HJK Helsinki, on a one-year contract. On 31 January 2016, he made his debut with HJK Helsinki in a Finnish League Cup match against IFK Mariehamn after being named in the starting line-up.

=== Go Ahead Eagles ===
On 9 February 2017, Rexhepi joined Eredivisie side Go Ahead Eagles, on a one-and-a-half-year contract. On 2 April 2017, he made his debut in a 1–2 away win against Twente after coming on as a substitute at 86th minute in place of Sam Hendriks.

=== KuPS ===
On 29 March 2018, Rexhepi joined Veikkausliiga side KuPS, on a five-month contract. On 18 April 2018, he made his debut in a 1–0 away defeat against RoPS after being named in the starting line-up.

=== Partizani Tirana ===
On 14 January 2019, Rexhepi joined Albanian Superliga side Partizani Tirana for the remaining part of 2018–19 season with the right of renewal for another year. On 22 January 2019, he made his debut with Partizani Tirana in the second round of 2018–19 Albanian Cup against Kastrioti after being named in the starting line-up. He made his first Albanian Superliga appearance on 25 January after being named in the starting line-up in a 0–1 minimal away win against Skënderbeu Korçë.

=== JäPS ===
In February 2020, Rexhepi joined Finnish club JäPS. He left the club again at the end of the year.

== International career ==
=== Finland ===
==== Youth ====
From 2008, until 2014, Rexhepi has been part of Finland at youth international level, respectively has been part of the U16, U18, U19, U20 and U21 teams and he with these teams played 22 matches and scored 2 goals.

==== Senior ====
On 14 January 2013, Rexhepi was named as part of the Finland's 22-man squad for the 2013 King's Cup in Thailand. His debut with Finland came on 26 January in the 2013 King's Cup final against Sweden after coming on as a substitute at 77th minute in place of Markus Halsti.

=== Kosovo ===
On 2 March 2014, Rexhepi received a call-up from Kosovo for the first permitted by FIFA match against Haiti and made his debut after coming on as a substitute at 65th minute in place of Loret Sadiku.

== Career statistics ==
=== Club ===
As of 25 January 2019

Appearances and goals by club, season and competition
Club	Season	League			National cup		League cup		Continental (Note: Appearance(s) in UEFA Europa League)		Other		Total	
Club	Season	Division	Apps	Goals	Apps	Goals	Apps	Goals	Apps	Goals	Apps	Goals	Apps	Goals
Honka	2011	Veikkausliiga	15	1	0	0	2	0	—		—		17	1
Honka	2012	Veikkausliiga	18	1	1	0	6	2	—		—		25	3
Honka	2013	Veikkausliiga	8	0	3	0	5	0	—		—		16	0
Honka	2014	Veikkausliiga	20	0	1	0	0	0	—		—		21	0
Honka	Total		61	2	5	0	13	2	0	0	0	0	79	4
Pallohonka (loan)	2012	Kakkonen	1	0	0	0	—		—		—		1	0
Lillestrøm	2015	Tippeligaen	0	0	0	0	—		—		—		0	0
HJK Helsinki	2016	Veikkausliiga	22	0	2	0	4	0	5	0	—		33	0
Go Ahead Eagles	2016–17	Eredivisie	2	0	0	0	—		—		—		2	0
Go Ahead Eagles	2017–18	Eerste Divisie	0	0	0	0	—		—		—		0	0
Go Ahead Eagles	Total		2	0	0	0	0	0	0	0	0	0	2	0
KuPS	2018	Veikkausliiga	16	0	0	0	—		2	0	—		18	0
Partizani Tirana	2018–19	Albanian Superliga	1	0	1	0	—		0	0	0	0	2	0
Career total			103	2	8	0	17	2	7	0	0	0	135	4

=== International ===
As of 3 June 2016

Appearances and goals by national team and year
National team	Year	Apps	Goals
Finland	2013	1	0
Total		1	0
Kosovo	2014	2	0
Kosovo	2015	0	0
Kosovo	2016	1	0
Total		3	0
