= Saša Matić (footballer) =

Swedish footballer (born 1993)

Personal information
- Full name: Saša Matić
- Date of birth: 25 September 1993 (age 33)
- Place of birth: Skärholmen, Sweden
- Height: 1.83 m (6 ft 0 in)
- Position: Forward

Youth career
- 1999–2013: Djurgårdens IF

Senior career*
Years	Team	Apps	(Gls)
2013	Djurgårdens IF	0	(0)
2013	→ Arameiska-Syrianska (loan)	19	(4)
2014	Arameiska-Syrianska	22	(6)
2015	Huddinge	25	(14)
2016–2018	AFC Eskilstuna	46	(7)
2019	Syrianska FC	9	(2)
- * Club domestic league appearances and goals as of 19:37, 3 September 2020 (UTC)

Saša Matić (born 25 September 1993) is a Swedish footballer.

== Career ==
=== Club career ===
Matic grew up in Skärholmen and started playing football in Djurgårdens IF when he was five. He was allowed to play two training matches with the A-team before the 2013 season but was then loaned to the division 2 club Arameiska-Syrianska IF. Prior to the 2014 season, he signed a permanent one-year contract with the club.

Ahead of the 2015 season, Matic signed for Huddinge IF. Matic made his division 1 debut on 11 April 2015 in a 2-0 loss to Carlstad United BK, where he was substituted in the 62nd minute. In total, Matic scored 14 goals in 25 games during the season.

In February 2016, Matic was signed by the Superettan club AFC Eskilstuna. Before the 2017 season, the club was promoted to the Allsvenskan and changed its name to AFC Eskilstuna. Matic made his Allsvenskan debut on 2 April 2017 in a 3-1 loss against GIF Sundsvall.

In the summer of 2019, Matic signed for Syrianska FC. He left the club at the end of the year.
