= Özcan Melkemichel =

Swedish footballer and manager

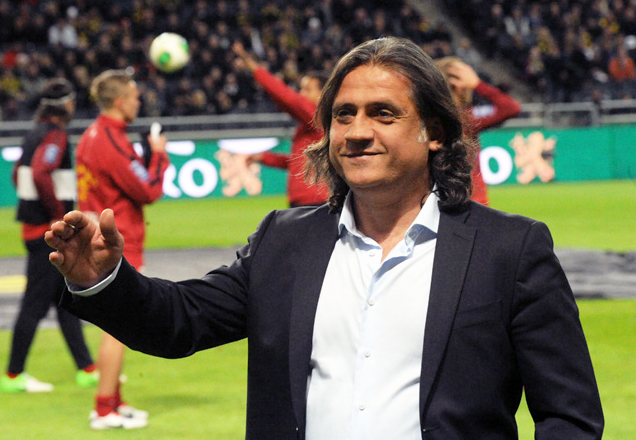
- Melkemichel in 2013

Personal information
- Date of birth: 21 February 1968 (age 58)
- Place of birth: Midyat, Turkey
- Position: Midfielder

Youth career
- 1978–1983: Syrianska FC

Senior career*
Years	Team	Apps	(Gls)
1983–1992	Syrianska FC		

Managerial career
- 2003–2004: Syrianska FC
- 2005–2013: Syrianska FC
- 2013–2016: AFC United
- 2017–2018: Djurgårdens IF
- 2020–2021: AFC Eskilstuna
- 2023–: Syrianska FC
- * Club domestic league appearances and goals

Özcan Melkemichel (born 21 February 1968) is a Swedish football manager and former player, most recently in charge of AFC Eskilstuna.

== Career ==
Melkemichel came to Sweden in 1975 after having been born in Turkey and then spending five years living in Germany. A midfielder, started playing for Syrianska FC in the team's second year of existence when they were still an amateur neighbourhood club. While working as a hairdresser he continued playing for the club for nine years as they advanced upwards through the Swedish football pyramid.

When he took over as manager he only intended for it to be a short term thing to help the club out. But after winning the Swedish fourth tier with the club he remained in the position and then brought the team to top tier, Allsvenskan.

Melkemichel took AFC United from the third tier to the first tier in three seasons.

Melkemichel served as manager for Djurgårdens IF for two seasons, but turned down a proposed contract extension for a third year. During his first season in charge of the club, Melkemichel led the team to a third-place finish, the club's best result since 2007, resulting in Djurgårdens IF's qualification to the second qualifying round for the 2018–19 UEFA Europa League. In his second year he led the team to a Svenska Cupen title, the club's first since 2005, however, Djurgårdens IF finished a disappointing seventh in the league behind both Stockholm rivals Hammarby (fourth) and AIK (winners).

== Personal life ==
Melkemichel is of Assyrian descent.

== Managerial honours ==
Djurgården IF

- Svenska Cupen: 2017–18
