= Rabi Elia =

Swedish footballer (born 1987)

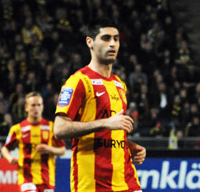

Personal information
- Full name: Rabi Elia
- Date of birth: 19 April 1987 (age 39)
- Place of birth: Sweden
- Height: 1.87 m (6 ft 1 1/2 in)
- Position: Defender

Team information
- Current team: Syrianska FC

Youth career
- Syrianska FC

Senior career*
Years	Team	Apps	(Gls)
2006–2015	Syrianska FC	139	(9)
2015	AFC United	23	(1)
2016–2020	Trosa-Vagnhärad SK	61	(5)
2021	United IK Nordic	13	(2)
2022–	Syrianska FC	11	(0)
- * Club domestic league appearances and goals as of 22 January 2023

Rabi Elia (born 19 April 1987) is a Swedish footballer of Assyrian descent who plays for Syrianska FC as a defender.
