= Besim Kunić =

Swedish footballer

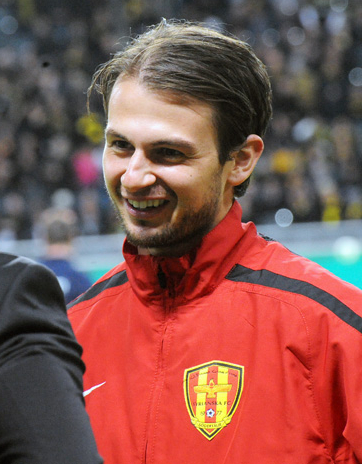

Personal information
- Date of birth: 13 February 1986 (age 40)
- Height: 1.87 m (6 ft 2 in)
- Position: Midfielder

Team information
- Current team: Vendelsö IK

Youth career
- Vasalunds IF

Senior career*
Years	Team	Apps	(Gls)
2004–2007	Vasalund/Essinge IF		
2008–2009	Vasalunds IF	23	(7)
2009–2015	Syrianska FC	52	(11)
2016–	Vendelsö IK		
- * Club domestic league appearances and goals as of 7 February 2016

Besim Kunić (born 13 February 1986) is a Swedish professional footballer who plays for Vendelsö IK as a midfielder.
