= Jesper Manns =

Swedish footballer (born 1995)

Personal information
- Full name: Jesper Per Manns
- Date of birth: 5 August 1995 (age 31)
- Place of birth: Eskilstuna, Sweden
- Height: 1.74 m (5 ft 9 in)
- Positions: Right back; left back

Team information
- Current team: Jönköpings Södra IF
- Number: 4

Youth career
- Triangelns IK
- –2011: Eskilstuna City

Senior career*
Years	Team	Apps	(Gls)
2012	Eskilstuna City	21	(1)
2013–2014	Jönköpings Södra IF	32	(2)
2015–2019	IF Elfsborg	65	(1)
2019	Kalmar FF	10	(0)
2020–2022	AFC Eskilstuna	79	(3)
2023–	Jönköpings Södra IF	39	(1)

International career
2011–2012	Sweden U17	7	(0)
2013–2014	Sweden U19	8	(0)
2014–2015	Sweden U21	4	(1)
- * Club domestic league appearances and goals as of 8 August 2024

Jesper Manns (born 5 August 1995) is a Swedish footballer who plays as a right or left back for Jönköpings Södra IF.
