= Nahir Oyal =

Swedish footballer

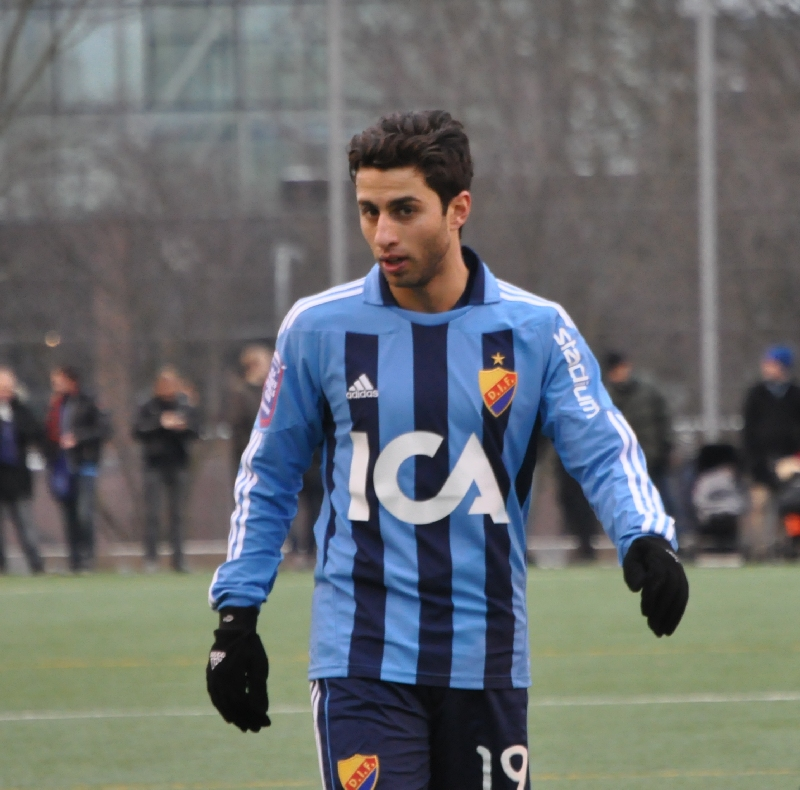
- Oyal in 2012.

Personal information
- Date of birth: 17 December 1990 (age 35)
- Place of birth: Södertälje, Sweden
- Height: 1.76 m (5 ft 9 1/2 in)
- Position: Midfielder

Team information
- Current team: Arameiska-Syrianska IF
- Number: 90

Youth career
- Assyriska FF
- 2007: Arameiska-Syrianska IF

Senior career*
| Years | Team | Apps | (Gls) |
| 2008 | Arameiska-Syrianska IF | 24 | (5) |
| 2009–2011 | Syrianska FC | 26 | (5) |
| 2010 | → Valsta Syrianska IK (loan) | 6 | (6) |
| 2012–2015 | Djurgårdens IF | 14 | (0) |
| 2013 | → Syrianska FC (loan) | 7 | (0) |
| 2014 | → Şanlıurfaspor (loan) | 4 | (0) |
| 2015–2017 | Syrianska FC | 27 | (2) |
| 2017– | Arameiska-Syrianska IF | 21 | (9) |
- * Club domestic league appearances and goals as of 30 November 2017

Nahir Oyal (born 17 December 1990), is a Swedish footballer who plays for Arameiska-Syrianska IF.

== Career ==
He played in Allsvenskan and Superettan with Syrianska FC before signing a 4-year pre-contract for Djurgårdens IF in the summer of 2011, transferring for the 2012 season. He was on loan to Syrianska FC and Şanlıurfaspor from Djurgårdens IF. He terminated his contract Djurgårdens IF in 2015.
