= Unofficial Football World Championships =

Informal lineal title

Current Champions
- Belgium

Title gained
- 15 November 2026: 4–1 vs Italy; 2026–27 UEFA Nations League; Brussels, Belgium

Next defence
- 25 March 2027: vs Germany; 2026–27 UEFA Nations League; TBD, Belgium

The Unofficial Football World Championships (UFWC) is an informal way of calculating the world's best international association football team, using a knock-out title system similar to that used in some combat sports. The UFWC was formalised by contributors to the Rec.Sport.Soccer Statistics Foundation (RSSSF) in 2002 and published by English journalist Paul Brown in a 2003 FourFourTwo article. Brown created a web page for the UFWC, and both this and the RSSSF tracked the progression of the championship.

The title is held by Belgium who won it from Italy on 15 November 2026.

== Background ==
The idea stemmed originally from some Scotland fans and sections of the media jokingly asserting that as they beat England (who had won the 1966 World Cup) in a British Home Championship match on 15 April 1967—England's first loss after their FIFA World Cup victory—they were the "Unofficial World Champions".

In 2002, football statisticians James Allnutt, Paul Crankshaw, Jostein Nygård, and Roberto Di Maggio defined the rules of the UFWC, traced its lineage and published it on the Rec.Sport.Soccer Statistics Foundation website. The following year, freelance journalist Paul Brown wrote an article on the UFWC in football magazine FourFourTwo. In 2011, Brown authored a book on the subject.

Brown created a UFWC website at ufwc.co.uk which tracked the championship. Updates became sporadic in the early 2020s, with fan-run alternatives more actively recording the championship's progression.

The UFWC is not sanctioned by FIFA, nor does it have any sort of official backing.

== Rules ==
- The first team to win an international football match were declared first ever Unofficial Football World Champions.
  - This was England, who defeated Scotland 4–2 in 1873 in the second full international match, the first in 1872 having been a 0–0 draw between the same two nations.
- The next full international (international 'A' match) involving the title holder is considered a title match, with the winners taking the title. (Note: Where the FIFA-accredited status of a match is in question, as was the case for 2013 King's Cup matches in January 2013, title matches must meet the FIFA definition of 'A' matches included in the UFWC rules: "an international 'A' match shall be a match that been arranged between two national A associations affiliated to the Federation and for which both Associations field their first national representative team.")
  - In the event of a title match being a draw, the current holders of the title remain champions.
- UFWC title matches are decided by their ultimate outcome, including extra time and penalties. (Note: An exception to this rule is if the second leg of a two-legged playoff goes into extra time because it is tied on aggregate goals and away goals. Since the purpose of the extra time (and penalty kicks if necessary) is to determine the winner of the playoff, not the individual match, it is not included.)
- Title matches are contested under the rules of the governing body by which they are sanctioned.

== Tracking the Championship ==
While the Unofficial Football World Championship was invented in 2002, the rules are such that results are analysed retrospectively to determine the theoretical lineage of champions from the very first international matches. A comprehensive list of results of all championship games were maintained on the UFWC website until March 2024.

=== Early international football ===
The first ever FIFA-recognised international match was a 0–0 draw between England and Scotland, on 30 November 1872 at Hamilton Crescent. The Unofficial World Championship thus remained vacant until the same two teams met again at the Kennington Oval on 8 March 1873. England won 4–2, and so are regarded as having become the inaugural Unofficial Football World Champions.

Early international football was almost entirely confined to the British Isles. Wales entered the UFWC 'competition' in 1876—holding it for the first time in 1907, and Ireland (the team representing the Belfast-based Irish Football Association, subsequently known as Northern Ireland) in 1882—first recording a UFWC victory in 1927. The UFWC title swapped between the Home Nations teams several times in this period, and was first competed by a non-British Isles team in 1909, when England defeated Hungary in Budapest.

None of the Home Nations teams competed in the 1930, 1934, or 1938 World Cups, and additionally the First and Second World Wars hindered football's globalization process further.

=== 1930s–2000s ===
It was 1931 when the title was first passed outside the British Isles, to Austria in their third attempt with a 5–0 victory over Scotland. They held the title until 7 December 1932 when they lost 4–3 to England at Stamford Bridge, and for all but the last few months of the decade it was held by those four teams. In the 1940s, the title was held by continental teams, notably those representing the Axis powers and countries neutral during World War II, but was recaptured by England in time for the 1950 World Cup. Here, in a shock result, they lost to the United States in one of the biggest upsets ever; it was the first venture of the title onto the Americas, and stayed there because Chile immediately took it with their win in the last game of the group stage which was not enough to qualify for the later stages. This made 1950 both the first World Cup where the title was at stake and not captured by the winners. It remained in the Americas for all but one of the following 16 years.

Football confederations

This time included the four-day reign of Netherlands Antilles, who beat Mexico 2–1 in a CONCACAF Championship match to become the smallest country ever to hold the title.

The UFWC returned to Europe in time for the 1966 FIFA World Cup with the Soviet Union. They lost the championship in the semi-final to West Germany, who lost the final to England. The following year, the England v Scotland match of 1967, which first gave rise to the idea of an unofficial world championship, really was a UFWC title match. With West Germany's victory over Netherlands in the 1974 World Cup Final, West Germany became the first team to hold the World Cup, European Championship and the UFWC at the same time. The title stayed in Europe until 1978, when it was taken by Argentina, the winners of the 1978 World Cup. It remained in South America until the 1982 World Cup where Peru lost to Poland. The UFWC remained in Europe for the next ten years, except for a one-year tenure by Argentina.

In 1992, the title returned to the United States and then was held for one match by Australia, before it worked its way through several South American nations, back through Europe and to its first Asian holders, South Korea, who defeated Colombia in the 1995 Carlsberg Cup semi-final. The Koreans lost the title to FR Yugoslavia in their next match, and the UFWC remained in Europe until March 1998 when Germany lost it to Brazil in a friendly. Argentina then defeated Brazil in a friendly to carry the UFWC into the 1998 World Cup, where France repeated Argentina's 1978 feat by taking the title as they won the World Cup on home turf, beating Brazil 3–0 in the final.

=== 2000–2010 ===
After beating Germany in the group stages at UEFA Euro 2000, England took the title for the last time to date, before losing to Romania in the following match. France and Spain enjoyed spells as champions before the Netherlands won the title in March 2002. As the Dutch had failed to qualify for the 2002 World Cup, the UFWC was, unusually, not at stake at the official World Cup. The Netherlands retained the title until 10 September 2003, when they lost a Euro 2004 qualifier 3–1 to the Czech Republic.

The Czechs defended their title a few times, before losing it to the Republic of Ireland in a friendly via a last-minute winner by Robbie Keane. The title then went to an African nation for the first time, as they lost it to Nigeria. Angola won and kept this title through late 2004 and early 2005. They were then beaten by Zimbabwe (in a match that tripled as a World Cup qualifier and an African Nations qualifier), who held the title for six months before Nigeria re-gained it in October 2005. Nigeria were beaten by Romania, who lost it to Uruguay within six months. Uruguay became the highest ranked team to hold the title since 2004, but their failure to qualify for the World Cup finals meant that, for the second time in succession, the unofficial title was not available at the official championships.

The title was brought back to Europe by Georgia on 15 November 2006, with both goals scored by Levan Kobiashvili in a 2–0 victory. They lost the title to the highest ranked team in the UFWC of all time, Scotland, on 24 March 2007, nearly forty years since Scotland had last gained the title. Just four days later, Scotland conceded the title 2–0 to FIFA World Cup holders Italy, and the title passed through the hands of Hungary twice, Turkey, Greece and Sweden before being claimed by the Netherlands, who eventually lost the title to Spain in the 2010 FIFA World Cup Final after a run that saw more successful defences than any other reign with 21.

=== 2010–2018 ===
The European sojourn of the title was brought to an end when Argentina beat Spain 4–1 in a September 2010 friendly, and after beating the Argentines in a friendly, Japan brought the title to the Asian Cup for the first time in 2011, and remained unbeaten throughout the tournament. Scheduled defenses of the title were cancelled after the 2011 earthquake and tsunami, and they held the title for over a year before relinquishing it to North Korea, ranked 124th in the world by FIFA, the lowest ranking of a UFWC champion since the rankings were introduced in 1993. North Korea continued to hold title through their successful campaign in the 2012 AFC Challenge Cup, where low-ranked nations Philippines, Tajikistan, India, Palestine, and Turkmenistan challenged, the last of whom almost pulled off a major upset. North Korea's reign was memorable for the fact that so many low-ranking teams challenged to become holders of the crown – as well as the aforementioned AFC Challenge Cup, low ranking nations competing in the 2013 EAFF East Asian Cup second preliminary round such as Kuwait, Indonesia, Chinese Taipei, Guam, and Hong Kong all unsuccessfully attempted to take the title away from North Korea.

The title was finally taken from North Korea by Sweden in the 2013 King's Cup, a result not recorded as a full international by FIFA, but nevertheless considered valid by the UFWC website. In a friendly in February, Sweden were beaten by Argentina who took the title to South America. In October, Argentina lost a FIFA World Cup qualifier to Uruguay.

Uruguay took the UFWC into Group D of the 2014 FIFA World Cup. During the group-stage an already-eliminated England challenged Costa Rica for the UFWC in their third group-stage game and the UFWC was mooted as a potential consolation prize in the British press, however the match was drawn and Costa Rica took the UFWC into the knockout phase. The UFWC and World Cup were "unified", with Germany securing both in the final.

Shortly after the World Cup, the runners-up Argentina beat Germany in a friendly to claim the UFWC title. This reign ended one match later, when Brazil won the UFWC title after winning 2014 Superclásico de las Américas.

Brazil held onto the title to take it into the 2015 Copa América, where it ended up with tournament winners Chile. Chile lost the title to Uruguay who took it into the Copa América Centenario, but regained it before winning the tournament. The UFWC was exchanged between CONMEBOL sides during 2018 FIFA World Cup qualification, and remained in South America despite being contested by outside teams during Chile's successful 2017 China Cup campaign. Ultimately it was Peru who took the Championship into the 2018 FIFA World Cup where the title ended up with tournament victors France.

=== 2018–present ===
For the next four years, the title was traded between UEFA teams, including the Netherlands, Germany, Italy, Spain, France, and Denmark, with most matches being either Euro 2020 qualifying, UEFA Nations League, or World Cup 2022 qualifying games. In terms of number of consecutive title defenses, the 2020–2021 streak by Italy, which included their victorious UEFA Euro 2020 campaign, was the joint longest in UFWC history (tied with the Netherlands in 2008–2010).

Croatia brought the title to the 2022 FIFA World Cup, which ended up in the hands of victors Argentina, who went unbeaten for almost a year before losing the title to Uruguay during World Cup qualification in 2023. The title then returned to Africa after 2023 Africa Cup of Nations champions Ivory Coast took it from Uruguay. On 15 October 2024, Sierra Leone, ranked 125th in the world at the time, defeated Ivory Coast, becoming the lowest-ranked team to be Unofficial World Champions. On 27 October, Sierra Leone lost to 149th-ranked Liberia, who in turn became the lowest-ranked team to hold the title. Liberia held the title until the end of their AFCON qualifying run, losing to Algeria 5–1. Algeria maintained the title for 7 months until their reign ended in a friendly to Sweden.

On 8 September 2025, Kosovo took the crown by defeating Sweden 2–0 in the second round of their 2026 FIFA World Cup qualification group, and on 31 March 2026, Turkey defeated Kosovo in World Cup qualification to advance to the final tournament. After winning their friendly matches, Turkey brought the UFWC into the 2026 FIFA World Cup. The title passed to Australia and the United States before returning to Turkey in their final group stage game after their elimination from the tournament. Turkey was then stripped of the title in their next match against France in the 2026–27 UEFA Nations League. In the same tournament, the title passed to Italy and then to Belgium.

== All-time rankings ==
The UFWC website maintained an all-time ranking table of teams, sorting by number of championship matches won. Owing mostly to their successes in the early years of international football, where competition was almost entirely limited to the British Isles, the top ranked team is Scotland.

As of match played 15 November 2026.

All-time rankings
Rank	Team	UFWC matches		UFWC last held
Rank	Team	Pld	W	UFWC last held
1	Scotland	149	86	28 March 2007
2	England	146	73	20 June 2000
3	Argentina	116	72	16 November 2023
4	Netherlands	96	58	7 September 2020
5	Italy	82	46	15 November 2026
6	Russia (Note: Russia's statistics include figures for the Soviet Union before 1992.)	64	41	23 February 2000
7	Brazil	72	38	17 June 2015
8	France	72	36	12 November 2026
9	Germany (Note: Germany's statistics include figures for West Germany 1949–1990.)	69	31	6 September 2019
10	Sweden	50	29	8 September 2025
11	Uruguay	68	28	26 March 2024
12	Chile	49	21	23 March 2017
13	Spain	34	18	10 October 2021
14	Hungary	47	17	10 September 2008
15	Czech Republic (Note: Czech Republic's statistics include figures for Czechoslovakia before 1994.)	38	15	31 March 2004
16	Peru	42	14	16 June 2018
17	Austria	38	12	16 June 1968
17	Wales	70	12	14 September 1988
19	Croatia	22	11	13 December 2022
19	Greece	24	11	24 May 2008
19	Japan	24	11	15 November 2011
22	North Korea	16	10	23 January 2013
22	Switzerland	36	10	26 June 1994
24	Colombia	32	9	26 June 2015
25	Bolivia	20	8	31 August 2017
25	Costa Rica	13	8	5 July 2014
25	Paraguay	32	8	6 September 2016
25	Romania	25	8	23 May 2006
29	Angola	10	7	27 March 2005
29	Zimbabwe	11	7	8 October 2005
31	Belgium	23	6	Current Champion
31	Bulgaria	22	6	4 September 1985
31	Denmark	25	6	10 June 2022
34	Algeria	10	5	9 June 2025
34	Ivory Coast	9	5	15 October 2024
34	Northern Ireland (Note: Northern Ireland's statistics include figures for Ireland before 1953.)	64	5	14 October 1933
34	Serbia (Note: Serbia's statistics include figures for Yugoslavia before 1992 and Serbia and Montenegro 1992–2006.)	18	5	31 May 1995
34	Turkey	14	5	25 September 2026
39	Kosovo	7	4	31 March 2026
39	Nigeria	8	4	16 November 2005
39	Poland	21	4	7 May 1989
42	Mexico	18	3	18 June 2016
42	Republic of Ireland	9	3	29 May 2004
42	United States	9	3	25 June 2026
45	Australia	9	2	19 June 2026
45	Ecuador	16	2	22 August 1965
45	Georgia	4	2	24 March 2007
45	Liberia	4	2	17 November 2024
45	Portugal	22	2	4 June 1992
50	Curaçao (Note: Curaçao's statistics include figures for Netherlands Antilles before 2011.)	4	1	28 March 1963
50	Israel	7	1	26 April 2000
50	Sierra Leone	4	1	27 October 2024
50	South Korea	6	1	4 February 1995
50	Venezuela	7	1	18 October 2006

== UFWC at major championships ==
Due to the nature of group stages, a team may win or retain the UFWC without qualifying for the knock-out stages of a competition. If, on the other hand, the UFWC champion reaches the knock-out stage, then the title of that competition will be unified with the UFWC.

=== Global ===
==== FIFA World Cup ====
Year	Holders going into competition	Holders at end of competition	Holders absent from competition
1930	—N/a	—N/a	England
1934	—N/a	—N/a	Wales
1938	—N/a	—N/a	Scotland
1950	England	Chile	—N/a
1954	—N/a	—N/a	Paraguay
1958	Argentina	Brazil	—N/a
1962	Spain	Mexico	—N/a
1966	Soviet Union	England	—N/a
1970	—N/a	—N/a	Switzerland
1974	Netherlands	West Germany	—N/a
1978	France	Argentina	—N/a
1982	Peru	Italy	—N/a
1986	West Germany	Argentina	—N/a
1990	—N/a	—N/a	Greece
1994	Romania	Colombia	—N/a
1998	Argentina	France	—N/a
2002	—N/a	—N/a	Netherlands
2006	—N/a	—N/a	Uruguay
2010	Netherlands	Spain	—N/a
2014	Uruguay	Germany	—N/a
2018	Peru	France	—N/a
2022	Croatia	Argentina	—N/a
2026	Turkey	Turkey (Note: Over the course of the tournament, Turkey lost the title to Australia, who then lost the title to the United States, who in turn lost the title back to Turkey.)	—N/a

No team has ever successfully defended the Unofficial World Championship title through a World Cup Finals undefeated. The Netherlands have come closest, remaining unbeaten in both the 1974 and 2010 competitions right up until the final, where they lost to West Germany and Spain respectively. West Germany were also beaten finalists in 1986, but the title changed hands four times during the tournament. Turkey lost the title in the 2026 but regained it before being eliminated in the group stage, the first and only time the title has entered and exited the tournament with the same team.

In 1950, 1962, 1994, and 2026, UFWC holders were eliminated in the group stage.

==== FIFA Confederations Cup ====
Year	Holders going into competition	Holders at end of competition
1992	Argentina	Argentina

=== Continental ===
The championships of each of the continental championships are only listed when the UFWC was contested during the tournament. The continental championships of Africa and Oceania have not yet seen competition for this title.

==== UEFA European Championship ====
Year	Holders going into competition	Holders at end of competition
1976	Czechoslovakia	Czechoslovakia
1984	Yugoslavia	France
1996	Russia	Germany
2000	Germany	France
2021	Italy	Italy

==== UEFA Nations League Finals ====
Year	Holders going into competition	Holders at end of competition
2021	Italy	France

==== Copa América ====
Year	Holders going into competition	Holders at end of competition
1953	Brazil	Uruguay
1955	Paraguay	Argentina
1956	Argentina	Brazil
1957	Argentina	Peru
1959	Brazil	Brazil
1959	Brazil	Uruguay
1979	Paraguay	Chile
1993	Argentina	Argentina
2015	Brazil	Chile
2016	Uruguay	Chile

==== CONCACAF Gold Cup ====
Year	Holders going into competition	Holders at end of competition
1963	Mexico	Costa Rica

==== AFC Asian Cup ====
Year	Holders going into competition	Holders at end of competition
2011	Japan	Japan

== Book ==
Unofficial Football World Champions
- Author: Paul Brown
- Language: English
- Genre: Sports
- Publisher: Superelastic
- Publication date: 4 January 2011
- Publication place: UK
- Media type: Print (paperback)
- Pages: 186
- ISBN: 9780956227027

Freelance journalist Paul Brown, who wrote the original FourFourTwo article on the UFWC and created the UFWC website, wrote a book on the championship which was published by Superelastic in 2011. Written in English, it has also been translated into Japanese. As of 2018, four editions of the book have been published, with the latest UFWC developments added to each.

== Similar concepts ==
The concept of such a title is not unique to the UFWC; similar concepts, with different rules and therefore different lineages, are discussed below.

=== UFWC Spin-offs ===
The online community at the UFWC website tracked UFWC-like lineages confined to each FIFA confederation and a Women's Unofficial Football World Championships which could be traced back either to the first FIFA-recognised women's international in 1971 (a 4–0 victory for France over The Netherlands) or to earlier internationals that are not FIFA recognised.

=== Nasazzi's Baton, Di Stefano’s Baton and Netto's Baton ===
A similar virtual title, Nasazzi's Baton, traces the "championship" from the first World Cup winners Uruguay, after whose captain it is named. Nasazzi's Baton follows the same rules as the UFWC, except that it treats all matches according to their result after 90 minutes. Another virtual title, Netto's Baton, follows the same rules but is traced from the first UEFA European Championship winners Soviet Union and is confined to UEFA member national teams. Similarly, Di Stéfano’s Baton is held by clubs, not national teams, and is traced back from the first UEFA Champions League final in 1956.

=== Virtual World Championship ===
Another virtual title, the Virtual World Championship, operates along the same boxing-style lines but only counts matches in FIFA-recognised championships and their qualifying stages. This title is traced from the 1908 Olympic Games, and treats all matches according to their result after 90 minutes. Olympic competitions since 1936 are not considered, as full international teams ceased to take part after that tournament.

=== Pound for Pound World Championship ===
Another similar competition, the Pound for Pound World Championship (PPWC), was created by Scottish football magazine The Away End. This title only recognises competitive games, although it recognises many unofficial tournaments which are considered to be friendlies by FIFA. As with the UFWC, extra time and penalties are taken into account in defining the winner of a match. It only counts games from as far back as the first FIFA World Cup in 1930, and states that no matter who holds the title of Pound for Pound World Champion they must relinquish the crown at the beginning of every World Cup finals. At the end of the tournament the World Cup winners are crowned the new Pound for Pound World Champions. Therefore, the tournament is "reset" every four years.
