= Robert Massi =

Swedish footballer

Personal information
- Full name: Robert Massi
- Date of birth: 2 January 1987 (age 39)
- Place of birth: Kiruna, Sweden
- Height: 1.84 m (6 ft 1/2 in)
- Position: Midfielder

Team information
- Current team: AFC United

Youth career
- Syrianska FC

Senior career*
| Years | Team | Apps | (Gls) |
| 2005 | IF Brommapojkarna | 0 | (0) |
| 2006–2015 | Syrianska FC | 135 | (16) |
| 2015– | AFC United | 0 | (0) |
- * Club domestic league appearances and goals as of 14 March 2015

Robert Massi (born 2 January 1987) is an Assyrian-Swedish footballer who plays for AFC United as a midfielder.
