= Petter Gustafsson =

Swedish retired footballer (born 1985)

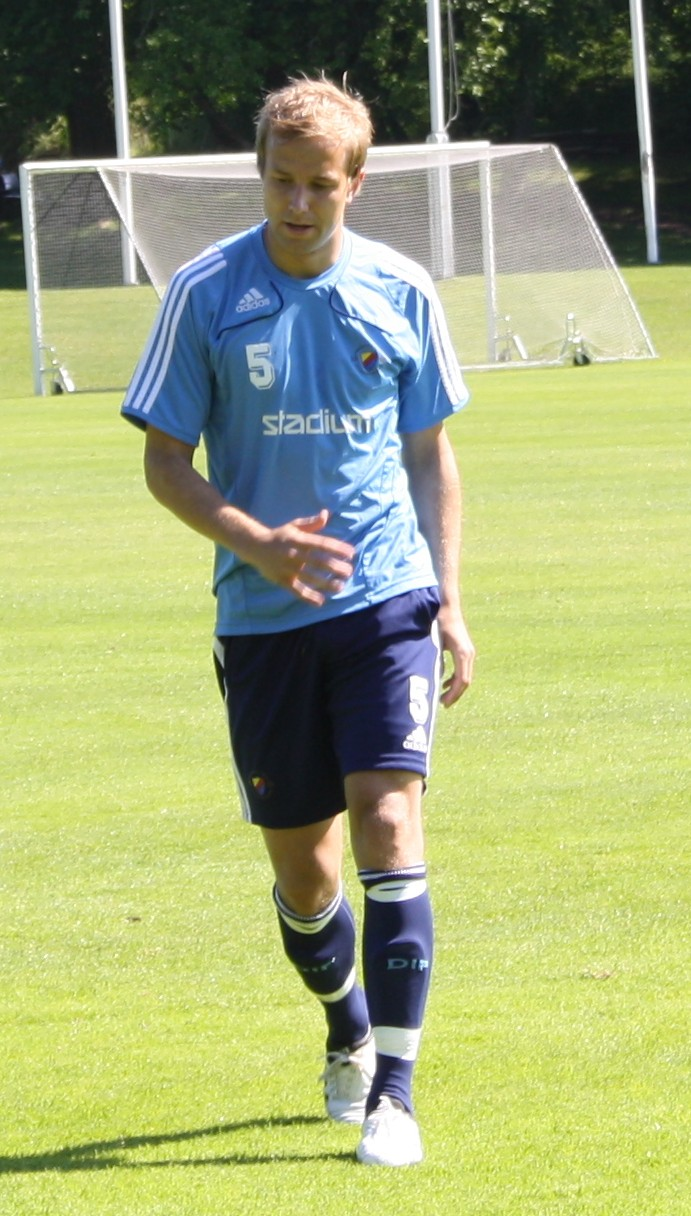

Personal information
- Full name: Petter Gustafsson
- Date of birth: 16 September 1985 (age 41)
- Place of birth: Sweden
- Height: 1.79 m (5 ft 10 1/2 in)
- Positions: Full back; winger

Youth career
- IFK Anderstorp

Senior career*
Years	Team	Apps	(Gls)
2000–2004	Sunnanå SK		
2005	Skellefteå AIK		
2006–2008	Skellefteå FF		
2009–2013	Djurgårdens IF	114	(5)
2014–2015	Åtvidabergs FF	7	(0)
- * Club domestic league appearances and goals as of 9 January 2016

Petter Gustafsson (born 16 September 1985) is a Swedish retired footballer who played as a defender.

He scored 13 goals for his former team Skellefteå FF as winger during the 2008 season, but can also play fullback which has been his primary position in recent years. Gustafsson signed for Djurgården on 19 February 2009. He made his Allsvenskan debut on 6 April 2009 against Örebro SK. Petter scored his first goal in Allsvenskan against Elfsborg on 24 October 2010.

== Honours ==
2008 player of the year Swedish football Division 2 Västerbotten.
