= 2013 King's Cup =

Tournament details
- Host country: Thailand
- Dates: 23–26 January
- Teams: 4 (from 2 confederations)
- Venue: 700th Anniversary Stadium

Final positions
- Champions: Sweden (4th title)
- Runners-up: Finland

Tournament statistics
- Matches played: 4
- Goals scored: 13 (3.25 per match)
- Attendance: 23,500 (5,875 per match)
- Top scorer(s): (Finland) Mikael Forssell (2 goals)

The 2013 King's Cup was an international football competition, the 42nd edition of the tournament. It was a two-round knockout tournament, with all matches held at the 700th Anniversary Stadium in Chiang Mai, Thailand between 23 January and 26 January. This edition features the hosts Thailand and three invited teams (Sweden, Finland and North Korea). In the final Sweden defeated Finland 3–0 to win the tournament.

Going into the tournament, North Korea were unofficial football world champions. In winning their semi-final, Sweden took the title and successfully defended it in the final.

== Venue ==
Chiang Mai
700th Anniversary Stadium
Capacity: 25,000
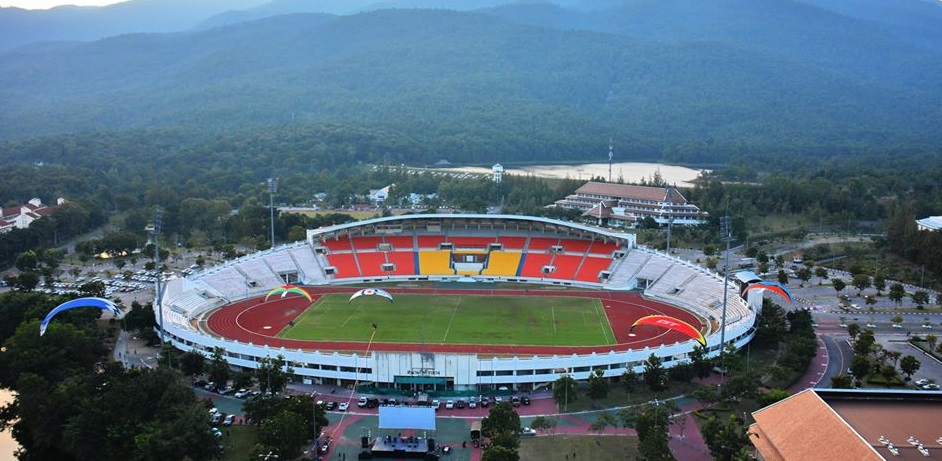

== Bracket ==
Semi-finals
23 January – Chiang Mai
Sweden (pen.)	1 (4)
North Korea	1 (1)
23 January – Chiang Mai
Thailand	1
Finland	3

Final
26 January – Chiang Mai
Sweden	3
Finland	0
Third place
26 January – Chiang Mai
North Korea	2
Thailand	2

== Matches ==
All times are local (UTC+7)

=== Semi-finals ===
23 January 2013
17:00

Sweden	1–1	North Korea
Fejzullahu 56'	Report	Hong Kum-song 48'
Penalties
Svensson (penalty scored); Majstorović (penalty scored); Hysén (penalty scored); P. Jansson (penalty scored)	4–1	(penalty missed) Jang Kuk-chol; (penalty missed) Kang Kuk-chol; (penalty scored) Kim Chol-bom

700th Anniversary Stadium, Chiang Mai
Attendance: 500
Referee: Mongkolchai Pechsri (Thailand)

23 January 2013
19:00

Thailand	1–3	Finland
Narubodin 68'	Report	Sumusalo 5'; Forssell 12', 87'

700th Anniversary Stadium, Chiang Mai
Attendance: 23,000
Referee: Vo Minh Tri (Vietnam)

=== Third place match ===
26 January 2013
15:00

Thailand	2–2	North Korea
Teeratep 26' (pen.); Datsakorn 61'	Report	Jo Kwang 58'; Pak Hyon-il 70'

700th Anniversary Stadium, Chiang Mai
Referee: Vo Minh Tri (Vietnam)

3rd Place shared

=== Final ===
26 January 2013
17:00

Sweden	3–0	Finland
Hysén 23'; Quaison 73'; Svensson 90'	Report

700th Anniversary Stadium, Chiang Mai
Attendance: 5,000
Referee: Chaiya Mahapab (Thailand)

== Winner ==
2013 King's Cup champions

Sweden
4th title
