= Daniel Jarl =

Swedish footballer

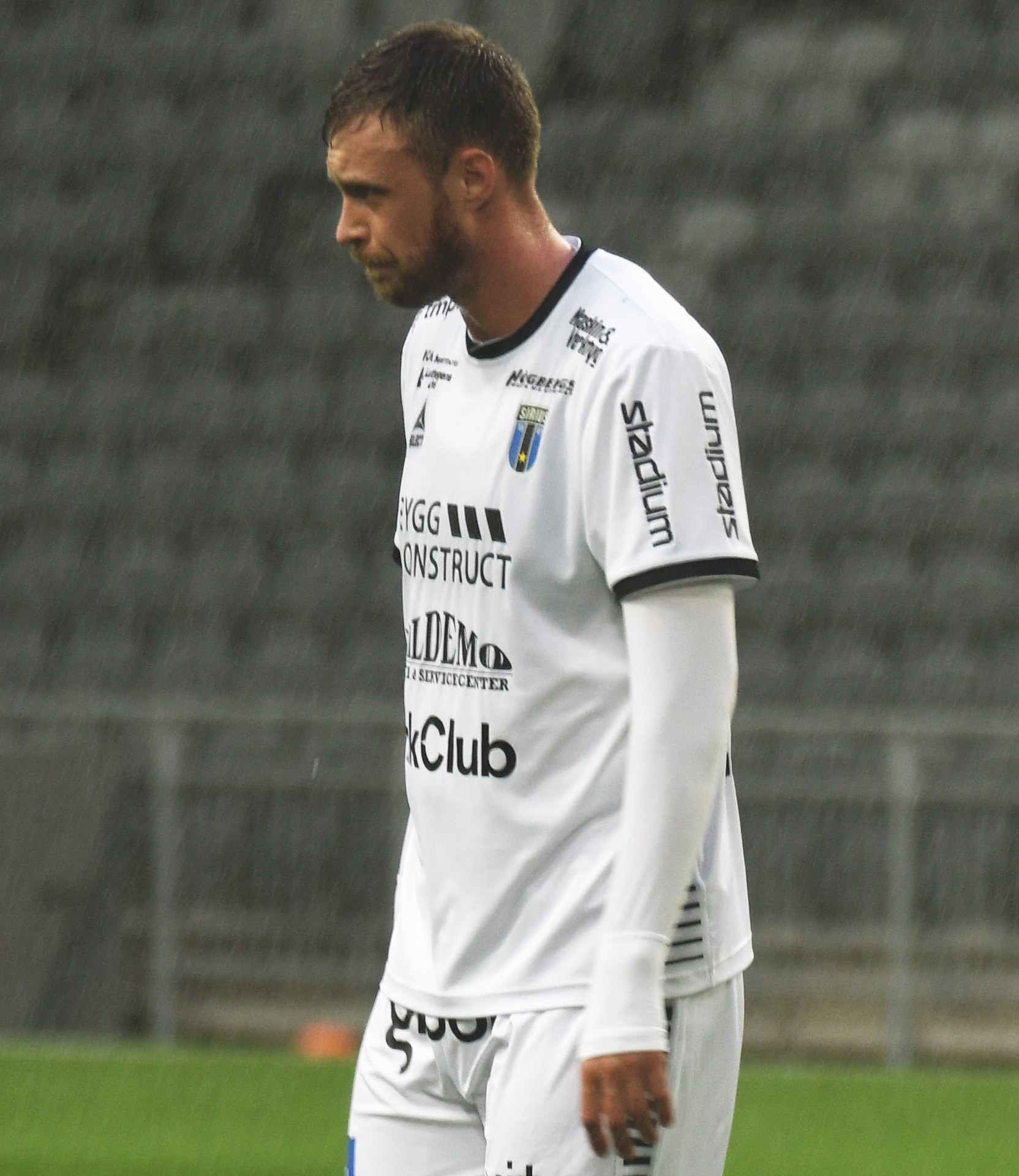

Personal information
- Full name: Daniel Albert Viktor Jarl
- Date of birth: 13 April 1992 (age 34)
- Place of birth: Bålsta, Sweden
- Height: 1.97 m (6 ft 5 1/2 in)
- Position: Defender

Youth career
- Håbo FF
- 2007–2010: Enköpings SK
- 2010–2011: Djurgårdens IF

Senior career*
Years	Team	Apps	(Gls)
2009–2010	Enköpings SK	28	(1)
2011–2013	Djurgårdens IF	2	(0)
2014–2015	Landskrona BoIS	36	(1)
2016	AFC United	28	(3)
2017–2020	IK Sirius	48	(0)
- * Club domestic league appearances and goals as of 1 November 2020

Daniel Jarl (born 13 April 1992) is a Swedish football player who plays as a defender.

Jarl made his Allsvenskan debut for Djurgårdens IF on 30 July 2011 starting against Malmö FF.
