= Marc Pedersen =

Danish footballer (born 1989)

Personal information
- Date of birth: 31 July 1989 (age 37)
- Place of birth: Give, Denmark
- Height: 1.83 m (6 ft 0 in)
- Position: Centre back

Youth career
- Give Fremad
- –2007: FC Midtjylland

Senior career*
Years	Team	Apps	(Gls)
2007–2011	Vejle BK	49	(0)
2010–2011	→ Randers FC (loan)	3	(0)
2012–2013	Djurgårdens IF	17	(1)
2013–2015	FC Fredericia	58	(4)
2015–2020	SønderjyskE	109	(4)
- * Club domestic league appearances and goals

Marc Pedersen (born 31 July 1989) is a Danish retired professional footballer.

== Club career ==
=== Early years ===
In 2007, he went from the youth team in FC Midtjylland, where he was captain, to Vejle Boldklub. Here he was part of the successful team which was promoted to the best Danish youth league in the fall of 2007. On 1 January 2008 he joined the senior first team squad in Vejle Boldklub.

=== Djurgårdens IF ===
Marc Pedersen became Djurgården last signing before the 2012 season of Allsvenskan. He did a promising pre-season and was in the premier of the league against IF Elfsborg away rewarded a spot in the starting eleven. In the second half he scored on a corner. He made a total of 17 allsvenskan appearances for Djurgården, leaving in 2013 for FC Fredericia.

=== Retirement ===
After playing no games for SønderjyskE in over a year due to a knee injury, Pedersen announced his retirement on 23 October 2020.
