= Peter Nymann =

Danish footballer (born 1982)

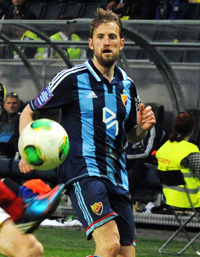
- Peter Nymann

Personal information
- Full name: Peter Nymann Mikkelsen
- Date of birth: 22 August 1982 (age 44)
- Place of birth: Copenhagen, Denmark
- Height: 1.79 m (5 ft 10 in)
- Position: Right back

Youth career
- Lillerød IF
- Frederikshavn fI

Senior career*
| Years | Team | Apps | (Gls) |
| 2003–2004 | B.93 | 2 | (2) |
| 2004–2006 | SønderjyskE | 29 | (2) |
| 2006–2009 | OB | 54 | (2) |
| 2009–2011 | Esbjerg | 64 | (3) |
| 2011–2013 | Djurgården | 70 | (4) |
| 2014–2016 | Vestsjælland | 64 | (1) |
| 2016–2021 | Horsens | 155 | (4) |

International career
| 2007–2010 | Denmark | 3 | (0) |
- * Club domestic league appearances and goals as of 30 July 2020 (UTC)

Peter Nymann Mikkelsen (born 22 August 1982) is a Danish professional footballer. Nymann is known for his explosive pace and precision crossing.

== Club career ==
=== SønderjyskE ===
Before joining SønderjyskE, Nymann played for B.93. He joined SønderjyskE in the summer 2004 at the age of 21. After SønderjyskE got relegated in the 2005/06 season, Nymann left the club because of a clause in his contract that assured that his contract could be terminated in case of the club would be relegated to the Danish 1st Division. Several clubs from the Danish Superliga was ready to offer him a contract. After manager Morten Bruun heard, that Nymann didn't wanted to continue, he took him of the team and relegated him to the reserve squad.

=== OB ===
Nymann joined Odense Boldklub on 8 June 2006 on a free transfer. Due to many injuries, Nymann didn't play so much and he said in August 2008, that he was open for a transfer. However, he stayed in the club and was offered a new contract in December 2008, but he rejected it. In the summer 2009 it was clear, that Nymann didn't wanted to stay at OB, though the club had offered him a new contract.

=== Esbjerg fB ===
On 11 June 2009 Esbjerg fB announced the signing of Nymann on a two-year contract. Until his transfer to Esbjerg, Nymann played as a winger. But from 2009 until 2011, he was used as a fullback. On 26 July 2009 Nymann scored 2 first half goals against Brøndby IF to secure a 2–1 victory.

=== Djurgårdens IF ===
The winger joined Swedish club, Djurgården, in July 2011.

In his debut for Djurgården, Nymann scored one goal and assisted to the other in a 2–2 draw against GAIS. Nymann refused to extend his contract, and left the club in January 2014.

=== FC Vestsjælland ===
On 22 December 2013 FC Vestsjælland confirmed, that they had signed Nymann from Djurgården.

=== AC Horsens ===
Nymann joined AC Horsens on 16 January 2016 on a six-month deal. His contract was extended in May 2016 until the summer 2018.

Nymann left Horsens at the end of the 2020–21 season.

== International career ==
Nymann was called up for the league national team, which plays a number of unofficial national team games in the United States, El Salvador and Honduras in January 2007, by national team manager Morten Olsen. He played the first game of the tour; a 3–1 defeat to the United States national team in Los Angeles, California.

Nymann made his national team debut on 3 March 2010 in a friendly against Austria.

== Honours ==
OB

- Danish Cup: 2006–07
