= Arameisk-Syrianska IF =

Swedish football club

- Full name: Arameisk-Syrianska Idrottsförening
- Founded: 1980 as Arameiska-Syrianska KIF
- Ground: Brunna IP, Norsborg, Botkyrka Municipality; Stockholm; Sweden
- Chairman: Afram Melki
- Manager: Robil Demir
- League: Division 2 Södra Svealand
- 2025: Division 2 Södra Svealand
Home colours	Away colours

Arameisk-Syrianska IF is a football club based in Botkyrka, a suburb of Stockholm, Sweden. Founded as Arameiska-Syrianska KIF by Syriacs (Arameans) in 1980, the club has progressed through the league system and currently competes in the fourth-highest Swedish league, Division 2. In 2008, the club adopted the name Syrianska Botkyrka IF after entering into a cooperation with Botkyrka municipality. The club has undergone name changes in the past, and was previously known as Arameiska-Syrianska KIF and Syrianska Botkyrka IF.

== Season to season ==
Season	Level	Division	Section	Position	Movements
1999	Tier 5	Division 4	Stockholm Södra	5th	
2000	Tier 5	Division 4	Stockholm Södra	9th	
2001	Tier 5	Division 4	Stockholm Södra	1st	Promoted
2002	Tier 4	Division 3	Östra Svealand	3rd	
2003	Tier 4	Division 3	Östra Svealand	6th	
2004	Tier 4	Division 3	Östra Svealand	2nd	
2005	Tier 4	Division 3	Östra Svealand	2nd	Promoted
2006*	Tier 4	Division 2	Östra Svealand	2nd	
2007	Tier 4	Division 2	Östra Svealand	1st	Promoted
2008	Tier 3	Ettan	Norra	8th	
2009	Tier 3	Ettan	Norra	8th	
2010	Tier 3	Ettan	Norra	14th	Relegated
2011	Tier 4	Division 2	Södra Svealand	6th	
2012	Tier 4	Division 2	Södra Svealand	7th	
2013	Tier 4	Division 2	Södra Svealand	5th	
2014	Tier 4	Division 2	Nora Svealand	8th	
2015	Tier 4	Division 2	Nora Svealand	4th	
2016	Tier 4	Division 2	Nora Svealand	1st	Promoted
2017	Tier 3	Ettan	Norra	8th	
2018	Tier 3	Ettan	Norra	14th	Relegated
2019	Tier 4	Division 2	Södra Svealand	11th	
2020	Tier 4	Division 2	Södra Svealand	7th	
2021	Tier 4	Division 2	Södra Svealand	10th	
2022	Tier 4	Division 2	Södra Svealand	11th	
2023	Tier 4	Division 2	Södra Svealand	6th	
2024	Tier 4	Division 2	Södra Svealand	3rd	
2025	Tier 4	Division 2	Södra Svealand		

* League restructuring in 2006 resulted in a new division being created at Tier 3 and subsequent divisions dropping a level.

== Current squad ==
As of 7 May 2025

Note: Flags indicate national team as defined under FIFA eligibility rules; some limited exceptions apply. Players may hold more than one non-FIFA nationality.

No.	Pos.	Nation	Player
1	GK	SWE	Nahir Saliba
2	DF	SWE	Richard Mourad
3	DF	SWE	Cihan Cavgacioglu
4	DF	SWE	Jonathan Demir
5	DF	SWE	Georgios Kasagiannis
7	FW	SWE	Hosip Youssef
8	MF	SWE	Matthias Davis
10	MF	SWE	Akis Lounis
11	MF	SWE	Michael Nakash
12	GK	SWE	George Korkis

No.	Pos.	Nation	Player
18	MF	SWE	Fahmi Haddad
19	MF	SWE	Ismael Lindqvist
21	FW	SWE	Danilo Ireflod
22	FW	SWE	Ousman Touray
23	MF	SWE	Matthew Ure
25	FW	SWE	Emmin Ghossi
26	MF	SWE	Asante Kenyatta
27	GK	SWE	Mahad Mahamod
30	GK	SWE	Nikola Simic
68	MF	SWE	Rinor Nushi
77	MF	SWE	Rudi Poles

== See also ==
- Assyriska FF
- Syrianska FC
- List of Assyrian-Syriac football teams in Sweden
