= Erton Fejzullahu =

Footballer (born 1988)

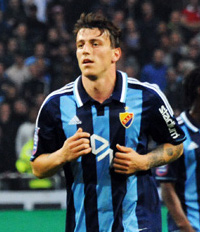
- Fejzullahu with Djurgårdens IF in 2013

Personal information
- Full name: Erton Fejzullahu
- Date of birth: 9 April 1988 (age 38)
- Place of birth: Mitrovica, SFR Yugoslavia
- Height: 1.80 m (5 ft 11 in)
- Position: Striker

Youth career
- 2000–2005: Högadals IS
- 2005–2007: Copenhagen

Senior career*
Years	Team	Apps	(Gls)
2005–2007	Copenhagen	0	(0)
2007	→ Mjällby AIF (loan)	22	(5)
2008–2009	Mjällby AIF	35	(16)
2009–2012	NEC Nijmegen	37	(3)
2011	→ Randers FC (loan)	7	(0)
2011–2012	→ Mjällby AIF (loan)	21	(6)
2012–2014	Djurgårdens IF	53	(23)
2014	→ Beijing Guoan (loan)	14	(7)
2015	Beijing Guoan	17	(5)
2016–2017	Dalian Transcendence	7	(1)
2017	Sarpsborg 08	12	(2)
2017–2018	Kalmar	32	(4)
2019	Žalgiris	7	(2)
Total		264	(74)

International career^{‡}
2005	Sweden U17	2	(0)
2009–2010	Sweden U21	7	(7)
2013–2014	Sweden	5	(3)
2015–2017	Kosovo	2	(0)
- * Club domestic league appearances and goals as of 18 November 2019 (UTC) ‡ National team caps and goals as of 2 September 2017

Erton Fejzullahu (born 9 April 1988) is a professional former footballer who played as a striker. He previously represented Sweden at youth and full international level before making his debut for the Kosovo national team in 2016.

== Early life ==
Fejzullahu was born in Mitrovica, SFR Yugoslavia. He came to Sweden as a three-year-old and grew up in the town of Karlshamn. He holds Kosovan, Albanian and Swedish passports.

== Club career ==
=== Youth career ===
Fejzullahu began his career with fifth-tier team Högadals IS, before moving to Danish side FC Copenhagen in 2005.

=== Mjällby AIF ===
In January 2007 Fejzullahu returned to Sweden to sign with Mjällby AIF, who played in the second tier Superettan at that time and therefore was the highest level club near his hometown. There Fejzullahu adjusted to first team football and eventually had a big breakthrough in the 2009 Superettan, where he scored 13 goals in 14 games during the first half of the season and played a key role in eliminating two Allsvenskan teams in the Svenska Cupen.

=== NEC Nijmegen ===
On 17 July 2009, Eredivisie club NEC Nijmegen signed Fejzullahu on a four-year contract. He started well and was a regular starter during his first year with the Dutch club. In his second year he found playing time harder to come by and was loaned out for a short period to Danish club Randers FC. He then went on a second loan back home to Mjällby for the second half of the 2011 Allsvenskan season. At first he struggled while playing for his old club. Fejzullahu later stated that this was caused by bad form and him lacking both mentally and physically at the time. He stayed with Mjällby for the first half of the following season too and there he finally started showing improved form, scoring six goals in 15 games. As the loan ended in summer 2012 Mjällby wanted to sign him permanently but could not afford it.

=== Djurgårdens IF ===
Djurgårdens IF instead bought him from the Dutch club for a reported sum of ten million SEK. On 31 July 2012, Fejzullahu signed a contract which made him a Djurgårdens IF player until summer 2016.

=== Beijing Guoan ===
On 30 July 2014, Fejzullahu made his debut for Beijing Guoan, as a loan player with a performance of two goals and an assist. On 1 January 2015, he signed a contract with Beijing Guoan after the expiry of the contract as loan player from Djurgårdens IF.

=== Dalian Transcendence ===
On 25 January 2016, Fejzullahu moved to China League One side Dalian Transcendence.

=== Sarpsborg 08 ===
On 28 March 2017, Fejzullahu signed to Eliteserien side Sarpsborg 08 and he signed a contract to end of 2017 Eliteserien. On 2 April 2017, he made his debut in a 3–1 home win against Sogndal after coming on as a substitute at 78th minute in place of Jonas Lindberg.

=== Kalmar ===
On 21 July 2017, Fejzullahu signed for Allsvenskan side Kalmar. On 23 July 2017, he made his debut in a 2–0 home win against AFC Eskilstuna after being named in the starting line-up.

== International career ==
In December 2012 Fejzullahu was selected for the first time ever to join the Sweden, on a three-game tour in January 2013. On 23 January 2013. Fejzullahu made his debut for the senior team and scoring the equalizing goal in a 1–1 draw against North Korea in the King's Cup. After full-time was played, the standing was 1–1, and Sweden won on penalty-shootout. Through this victory Sweden also became unofficial world champions.

In December 2014 Fejzullahu expressed to the media that he expected to be part of the Albania, since he was an ethnic Albanian and Sweden had ignored him. He was in contact with the Albanian Football Association and was expected to be called up by Albania's coach, Gianni de Biasi.

On 7 October 2015, Fejzullahu received a call-up from Kosovo for the friendly match against Equatorial Guinea and made his debut after being named in the starting line-up.

== Career statistics ==
=== Club ===
As of match played 10 July 2018

Appearances and goals by club, season and competition
Club	Season	League			Cup		Continental		Total		Ref.
Club	Season	Division	Apps	Goals	Apps	Goals	Apps	Goals	Apps	Goals	Ref.
F.C. Copenhagen	2006–07	Danish Superliga	0	0	—		—		0	0	
Mjällby AIF (loan)	2007	Superettan	22	5	0	0	—		22	5	
Mjällby AIF	2008	Superettan	23	6	0	0	—		23	6	
Mjällby AIF	2009	Superettan	12	10	2	3	—		14	13	
Mjällby AIF	Total		57	21	2	3	0	0	59	24	–
NEC	2009–10	Eredivisie	29	3	3	1	—		32	4	
NEC	2010–11	Eredivisie	8	0	1	0	—		9	0	
NEC	Total		37	3	4	1	0	0	40	4	–
Randers (loan)	2010–11	Danish Superliga	7	0	1	0	—		8	0	
Mjällby AIF (loan)	2011	Allsvenskan	6	0	0	0	—		6	0	
Mjällby AIF (loan)	2012	Allsvenskan	15	6	0	0	—		15	6	
Mjällby AIF (loan)	Total		21	6	0	0	0	0	21	6	–
Djurgårdens IF	2012	Allsvenskan	13	7	1	2	—		14	9	
Djurgårdens IF	2013	Allsvenskan	27	7	7	5	—		34	12	
Djurgårdens IF	2014	Allsvenskan	13	9	2	1	—		15	10	
Djurgårdens IF	Total		53	23	10	8	0	0	63	31	–
Beijing Guoan (loan)	2014	Chinese Super League	14	7	1	1	—		15	8	
Beijing Guoan	2015	Chinese Super League	17	5	2	1	6	0	25	6	
Dalian Transcendence	2016	China League One	7	1	0	0	—		7	1	
Sarpsborg 08	2017	Eliteserien	12	2	3	4	—		15	6	
Kalmar	2017	Allsvenskan	14	1	0	0	—		14	1	
Kalmar	2018	Allsvenskan	18	3	0	0	0	0	18	3	
Kalmar	Total		32	4	0	0	0	0	32	4	–
Žalgiris	2019	A Lyga	7	2	0	0	—		7	2	
Career total			264	74	23	18	0	0	287	92	–

=== International ===
Appearances and goals by national team and year
National team	Year	Apps	Goals
Sweden	2013	3	1
Sweden	2014	2	2
Sweden	Total	5	3
Kosovo	2015	1	0
Kosovo	2016	0	0
Kosovo	2017	1	0
Kosovo	Total	2	0
Total		7	3

Scores and results list the Fejzullahu's national team's goal tally first, score column indicates score after each Fejzullahu goal.

List of international goals scored by Erton Fejzullahu
No.	National team	Date	Venue	Opponent	Score	Result	Competition
1	Sweden	23 January 2013	700th Anniversary Stadium, Chiang Mai, Thailand	North Korea	1–1	1–1	2013 King's Cup
2	Sweden	17 January 2014	Mohammad Bin Zayed Stadium, Abu Dhabi, United Arab Emirates	Moldova	1–1	2–1	Friendly
3	Sweden	17 January 2014	Mohammad Bin Zayed Stadium, Abu Dhabi, United Arab Emirates	Moldova	2–1	2–1	Friendly

== Honours ==
Sweden

- King's Cup: 2013
