= Syrianska FC =

Association football club in Södertälje, Sweden

Syrianska
- Full name: Syrianska Football Club (SFC)
- Nickname: Suryoye
- Founded: 1 July 1977; 49 years ago as Suryoyo SK
- Ground: Södertälje Fotbollsarena, Södertälje
- Capacity: 6,100
- Chairman: Karam Chamoun
- Manager: Özcan Melkemichel
- League: Division 2
- 2026: Division 2 Södra Svealand, 12th of 14
- Website: http://www.syrianskafc.com/

Syrianska Football Club, also known as Syrianska FC or simply Syrianska, is a Swedish professional football club based in Södertälje in Stockholm County. The club was founded by Syriac-Aramean immigrants in 1977 as Suryoyo Sportklubb, or Suryoyo SK. In 1986, its name was changed to Syrianska SK. The club adopted its present name as it grew and advanced through the league system. In 2010, after two years in Superettan, Syrianska was promoted to Allsvenskan (the highest tier in Swedish football) for the first time in club history. This made Syrianska FC the 61st team to play in Allsvenskan. Since the Syriac people do not have an official national team, Syrianska is often seen as a substitute.

Syrianska FC has a worldwide fan base. Their promotion to Allsvenskan received extensive coverage on Swedish TV sports programs and in documentaries and domestic and foreign magazines.

== History ==
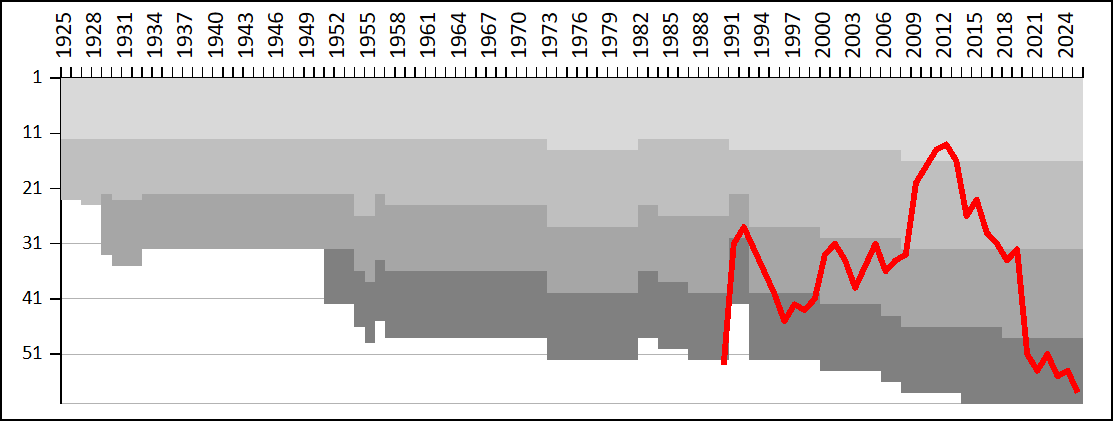
Chart showing the progress of Syrianska FC through the Swedish football league system. The shades of gray represent league divisions.

The Syriac Federation, based in Södertälje, founded the Suryoyo Sportklubb in 1977. The club was given a spot in Division 7 East. Six years later, it advanced from Division 7 to Division 6. In 1985, Suryoyo won the division and were promoted to Division 5. In 1986, the club changed its name to Syrianska SK. Two years later, Syrianska FC won Division 5 and advanced to Division 4 (where they played until 1990, when they advanced to Division 3).

Syrianska won the league as newcomers, and advanced to Division 2 (the third tier of Swedish football at the time) in 1993. In 1995, Syrianska FC was relegated to Division 3 for the first time in club history. The following year, its board set a goal of "Division 1 in 2001." In 1999, Syrianska was again promoted to Division 2. In 2000, Syrianska finished in third place after a strong season as newcomers and began investing in youth activities. The following year, they won Division 2 with 53 points and 65 goals. Syrianska attained their goal of winning the series, but did not advance to Superettan after their qualifier against Åtvidabergs FF. The series was played in two matches, the home match before a crowd of 6,435.

In 2003, Syrianska set a new goal of reaching Superettan by 2006. The following year, Syrianska had a mid-table position in Division 1 and again missed promotion in a Superettan qualifier. Syrianska lost at home against Qviding FIF 0–2, and won the away match 2–1. In 2006, with Özcan Melkemichel as coach, the club had their best season start and the new stadium in Södertälje became their home. After an injury-filled 2007 season, Syrianska defeated Assyriska 2–1 in a derby match before 7,146 fans. In the second match, Syrianska again defeated Assyriska 1–0 on a goal by Robert Massi in front of 6,313 spectators. The club would have won the division, but a points deduction derailed them to fourth place.

Before the series started in 2008, Syrianska played at home in the Svenska Cupen against Hammarby IF (a club from the Allsvenskan league) in a game broadcast by TV4. Hammarby led 4-0 into halftime, when Syrianska made a comeback. Goals from a Rabi Elias penalty, Mattias Metes' double and a Semir Metes one-strike tied the score at 4-4. Hammarby eventually scored two quick goals to win, 6–4.

Syrianska ensured a league victory with two rounds remaining, and finished with 59 points. In 2009, they played their first season in Superettan (Sweden's second-highest division). The club finished in fourth place, one point behind the third-place team. Syrianska won the Superettan league in 2010, with TV4 broadcasting nine of their matches. They ended the season with 56 points and 46 goals. Peter Ijeh led the team scoring with 17 goals, and for the first time in club history Syrianska was promoted to the Allsvenskan.

In 2012 Syrianska played their second season in Allsvenskan, finishing in 13th place with 34 points and 35 goals. They remained in Allsvenskan for the following season, when they finished last and were relegated to Superettan. In 2014 the club finished in tenth place with 10 wins, 4 draws and 11 losses, earning them a stay in the Superettan. In 2015, Syrianska finished the Superettan season in seventh place with 43 points. The following year they finished in 13th place, and survived a relegation playoff for a fourth straight season in the Superettan. In 2017, however, Syrianska finished fifteenth (next to last) and were relegated to Division 1.

In 2019 Syrianska finished in last place in Superettan and where relegated to Division 1. However, on the 28 of February 2020 the SvFF announced that Syrianska would be relegated a further division, into Division 2. The reason for this was that the club had not made the correct employer payments.

== Colours and badge ==
Aramean-Syriac flag, on which the club's colours are based

The club's badge was created when it changed its name to Syrianska FC. The winged torch and colours are taken from the Aramean-Syriac flag, which represents the Aramean-Syriac people. The Aramaic inscription reads, ܚܘܕܪܐ ܣܘܪܝܝܐ ܒܣܘܕܪܬܠܝܐ (Hudro Suryoyo b-Södertälje; Syriac Sports Club in Södertälje).

== Stadium ==
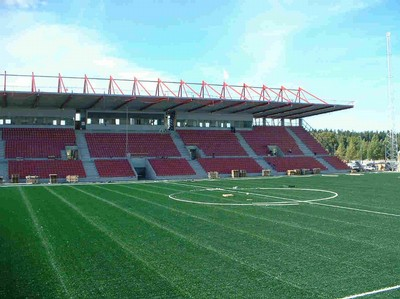
Södertälje Fotbollsarena

Syrianska FC's current home is the Södertälje Fotbollsarena in Södertälje, which is also the home of local rival Assyriska Föreningen. The stadium holds 6,700 people, and is expandable for larger games. In 2009, Syrianska FC played a derby against Assyriska; with a large crowd expected, the stadium increased its capacity to 9,500 people and 8,453 people watched the match. The stadium was built in 2005 for €12 million, and was funded by the Södertälje Municipality. The pitch measures 105 x 68 metres, with an artificial turf surface.

The stadium is also known as Jallavallen, from the Syriac word jalla ("hurry"). Locally coined by Telgerevyn, it later became widespread.

== Supporters ==
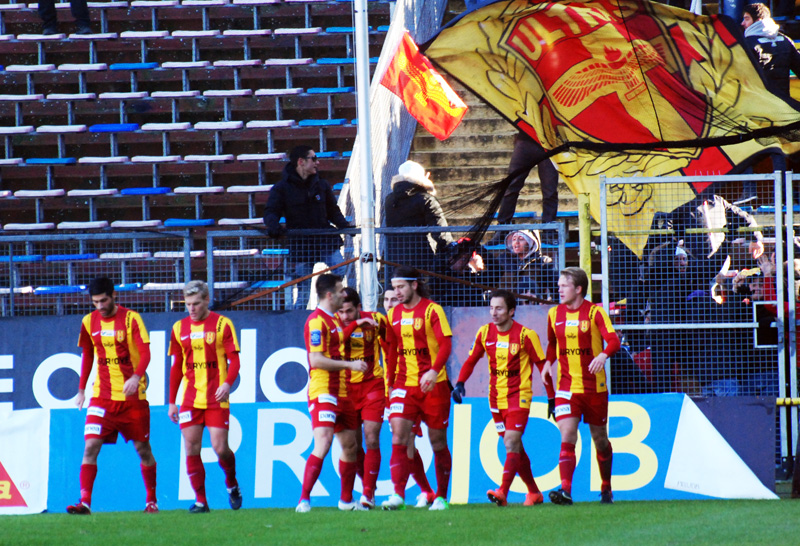
The Syrianska team, with supporters waving a flag behind them

Gefe Fans, the Syrianska FC fan club, was founded in 2002 by a group of supporters in Södertälje. Gefe means "wings", and refers to the wings in the flag of the Syriac-Aramean people. The club has fans worldwide, since it is considered the national team of the Syriac-Aramean people. The fan club, known for its tifos, takes responsibility for supporters around the arena and community efforts. Ultras 77 is a group of about 30 supporters who work with all tifo events during Syrianska FC games. During Gefe Fans' early years it was responsible for tifo events, but Ultras 77 was created when the supporter club merged with the football club.

== Retired numbers ==
12 – Club Supporters (the 12th Man)

== Youth ==
Youth activities at Syrianska FC have expanded, and interest in playing for the club is increasing. Syrianska is the club for over 500 children, youths in a number of age groups, and about 65 leaders. One of the club's goals is to have several teams in each age group and build a strong platform for social activities in the younger age groups. The club also aims to establish activities for the elderly. Regardless of skill, all are welcome to play.

== Honours ==
=== League ===
- Superettan
  - Winners (1): 2010
- Division 1 Norra
  - Winners (1): 2008

== Season to season ==
Season	Level	Division	Section	Position	Movements
2000	Tier 3	Division 2	West	3rd	
2001	Tier 3	Division 2	West	1st	Lost play-off
2002	Tier 3	Division 2	West	4th	
2003	Tier 3	Division 2	East	9th	
2004	Tier 3	Division 2	East	5th	
2005	Tier 3	Division 2	East	1st	Lost play-off
2006	Tier 3	Division 2		6th	
2007	Tier 3	Division 1	North	4th	
2008	Tier 3	Division 1	North	1st	Promoted
2009	Tier 2	Superettan		4th	
2010	Tier 2	Superettan		1st	Promoted
2011	Tier 1	Allsvenskan		14th	Won play-off
2012	Tier 1	Allsvenskan		13th	
2013	Tier 1	Allsvenskan		16th	Relegated
2014	Tier 2	Superettan		10th	
2015	Tier 2	Superettan		7th	
2016	Tier 2	Superettan		13th	Won play-off
2017	Tier 2	Superettan		15th	Relegated
2018	Tier 3	Division 1	North	2nd	Promoted
2019	Tier 2	Superettan		16th	Relegated 2 divisions
2020	Tier 4	Division 2	Östra Götaland	3rd	
2021	Tier 4	Division 2	Södra Götaland	6th	
2022	Tier 4	Division 2	Södra Götaland	3rd	
2023	Tier 4	Division 2	Södra Götaland	7th	
2024	Tier 4	Division 2	Södra Götaland	6th	
2025	Tier 4	Division 2	Södra Götaland	10th	

== Managers/coaches ==
- (Sweden) Özcan Melkemichel (Jan 2005–2013)
- (Brazil) Carlos Roberto Cabral (Jan 2014)
- (Sweden) Nemanja Miljanović (1 January 2015 – 31 December 2015)
- (Estonia) Valeri Bondarenko (26 Jan 2011 – 7 Dec 2011)
- (Sweden) Klebér Saarenpää (21 March 2012 – 2013)

== See also ==
- Arameisk-Syrianska IF
- Assyriska FF
- Valsta Syrianska IK
- List of Assyrian football teams in Sweden
