= 2014 Allsvenskan =

90th season of Allsvenskan

Allsvenskan
- Season: 2014
- Champions: Malmö FF; 21st Allsvenskan title 18th Swedish title
- Relegated: Mjällby AIF; IF Brommapojkarna
- Champions League: Malmö FF
- Europa League: IFK Göteborg; AIK; IF Elfsborg
- Matches: 240
- Goals: 702 (2.93 per match)
- Top goalscorer: Lasse Vibe (23 goals)
- Best goalkeeper: Kenneth Høie; Robin Olsen (77 save %)
- Biggest home win: IFK Göteborg 5–0 Åtvidabergs FF (17 April 2014)
- Biggest away win: IF Brommapojkarna 0–4 Djurgårdens IF (25 August 2014); IF Brommapojkarna 1–5 BK Häcken (20 September 2014); Kalmar FF 0–4 Djurgårdens IF (21 September 2014); IF Brommapojkarna 0–4 AIK (19 October 2014)
- Highest scoring: IFK Göteborg 6–2 Helsingborgs IF (6 July 2014); IFK Norrköping 3–5 Djurgårdens IF (14 July 2014)
- Longest winning run: 5 matches Örebro SK
- Longest unbeaten run: 14 matches Malmö FF
- Longest winless run: 19 matches IF Brommapojkarna
- Longest losing run: 9 matches IF Brommapojkarna
- Highest attendance: 30,650; AIK 0–2 IFK Göteborg (31 March 2014)
- Lowest attendance: 614; IF Brommapojkarna 1–5 BK Häcken (20 September 2014)
- Total attendance: 1,711,722
- Average attendance: 7,132

The 2014 Allsvenskan, part of the 2014 Swedish football season, was the 90th season of Allsvenskan since its establishment in 1924. The 2014 fixtures were released on 20 December 2013. The season started on 30 March 2014 and concluded on 1 November 2014. Malmö FF, the defending champions from the 2013 season, successfully defended their title.

Malmö FF's victory in the Swedish championship this season, their 21st Allsvenskan title and 18th Swedish championship overall, came in the 27th round on 5 October 2014 when they won 3–2 in the away fixture against AIK at Friends Arena. Malmö FF became the first club to defend a Swedish championship by winning consecutive Allsvenskan titles since Djurgårdens IF in the 2003 season.

A total of 16 teams contested the league; 14 returning from the 2013 season and two that were promoted from Superettan.

== Summary ==
=== Background ===
The annual pre-season kick-off meeting was held at Swedbank Stadion in Malmö on 25 March 2014. Managers and key players from the major teams as well as some of the predicted bottom teams were interviewed by representatives from the media as well as commentators from C More Entertainment, the official broadcasters of the league. Seven managers out of 16 believed that Malmö FF would defend the title. The remaining managers placed their bets on AIK (six votes), IF Elfsborg (two votes) and IFK Göteborg (one vote). The entire attendance consisted of the clubs' managers, key players and media experts. The attendance voted Malmö FF as the title favourites (41.9% of the votes) with AIK (38% of the votes) closely after, IFK Göteborg came in third with 6,7% of the votes. The attendance also predicted that Falkenbergs FF (38.3% of the votes) and Gefle IF (25.4% of the votes) were the two favourites to be relegated. When asked about the top goalscorer, a plurality of the audience voted for Malmö FF's Magnus Eriksson.

=== Season overview ===
The season started on 30 March 2014 with five fixtures. The most prominent match of the first round was the fixture between last year's runner-up AIK and last year's third placed team IFK Göteborg at Friends Arena on 31 March 2014, the match ended with a 2–0 win for IFK Göteborg. The reigning league champions Malmö FF started the season a day earlier with a home fixture at Swedbank Stadion against newcomers and first time Allsvenskan participants Falkenbergs FF, Malmö FF won the match 3–0 after a late surge. The first week of matches were deeply affected by the death of a Djurgårdens IF supporter prior to the match between Helsingborgs IF and Djurgården on 30 March 2014. A moment of silence were held at all venues for matches in the first round that were played after the event; players also wore mourning-bands to display their sympathy.

The season started out in a strong fashion for reigning champions Malmö who won the first four matches and drew in the fifth, not conceding a goal until the fourth match. In the process they defeated fellow title favourite Göteborg in the second week of matches at Gamla Ullevi. The first five weeks of matches saw Malmö top the table ahead of fellow title favourite Elfsborg while Göteborg and AIK positioned themselves 6th and 10th respectively. 2012 runners-up BK Häcken and last year's fourth placed team Kalmar FF chased Malmö and Elfsborg in the top of the table. In the lower part of the table Mjällby AIF and IF Brommapojkarna were positioned 16th and 15th respectively while newcomers and relegation favourites Falkenberg took 14th place. Gefle IF, the other team that were voted as one of the teams to be relegated found themselves in 11th place after five weeks of matches.

Seven more rounds of league matches were played before a months break for the 2014 FIFA World Cup. Two players from the league participated in the tournament, AIK's Celso Borges for Costa Rica and Malmö FF's Miiko Albornoz for Chile. The matches leading up to the break saw Malmö continuing to hold pole position in front of title challengers Elfsborg and Kalmar who were placed second and third respectively after twelve rounds. Both Malmö and Kalmar played several matches before losing, Malmö lost their first fixture in the seventh round at home against Häcken while Kalmar didn't lose a match until the tenth round in an away fixture, also against Häcken. In the last round of matches before the World Cup Malmö defeated Elfsborg at Borås Arena to create a six-point table gap to Elfsborg and Kalmar respectively. AIK recovered from their start of the season as they found themselves in fourth place before the break while the other favourites Göteborg remained in sixth place. IF Brommapojkarna had dropped down to last place in the table while Halmstads BK joined them in 15th place. Gefle positioned themselves in 14th place after the 12th week of matches while Mjällby proceeded upwards in the table, now arriving in safe territory in 13th place. Relegation favourites and newcomers alike Falkenberg took up 12th place after as many matches.

After twenty rounds of play, Malmö FF were clearly ahead of the other title contenders. Following a long win-less streak, Brommapojkarna seemed set to finish last as they were nine points behind Mjällby in 15th place. The toughest blow around this time for Brommapojkarna happened off the field; captain Pontus Segerström was diagnosed with a brain tumor. Segerström started undergoing treatment immediately. On 13 October Segerström died due to effects of the brain tumor. In the rounds to come it became clear that AIK and Elfsborg were Malmö FF's strongest contenders for the title. After the World Cup break Kalmar had started to fall in the table and were positioned 6th after 20 rounds. IFK Göteborg reached fourth place in the table after 22 rounds, having spent most of the season mid-table. A noteworthy event occurred on 19 August when Malmö FF celebrated a full consecutive year at the top of the Allsvenskan table.

In the 25th round Brommapojkarnas relegation to Superettan was confirmed as they lost 3–1 away to Helsingborg. In the same round Falkenberg was positioned 15th and was the closest team to join Brommapojkarna to the second tier of Swedish football. The other teams involved in the relegation battle was IFK Norrköping, Gefle and Mjällby, all teams separated by merely five points. At the other end of the table Malmö FF had an eight-point advantage to Elfsborg in second place with only five matches left to play. IFK Göteborg and AIK trailed Elfsborg with one point. Even though Malmö FF failed to win in three consecutive matches for the first time in more than a year, AIK and Elfsborg failed to take advantage. IFK Göteborg continued a strong streak and passed both AIK and Elfsborg to reach second place in the table for the first time this season. In the 27th round both Elfsborg and IFK Göteborg lost their early matches, providing Malmö FF with an opportunity to secure the title with at least one point at Friends Arena against AIK. Malmö FF ended up winning the match 3–2 and became Swedish champions for the second consecutive season, becoming the first Swedish club in eleven years to achieve this. The attention at the top of the table turned towards the two European berths beneath Malmö FF with IFK Göteborg, Elfsborg, AIK and Häcken competing with just four points between each other. At the bottom of the table Mjällby lost an important home fixture against already relegated Brommapojkarna while Norrköping and Falkenberg won their matches, sending Mjällby to 15th place with just three matches left to play. However the relegation battle was still very much alive as Gefle, Falkenberg and Norrköping were only one point ahead of Mjällby.

On October 29, Elfsborg manager Klas Ingesson died after battling cancer for several years. As a player, he represented IFK Göteborg and the Sweden national team on many occasions, and Ingesson had served as manager of IF Elfsborg since September 2013. Norrköping and Falkenberg gained some ground in the relegation battle after winning their games in the 28th round, IFK Norrköping against fellow relegation contenders Gefle and Falkenberg against Helsingborg. Meanwhile, Mjällby lost their match in the same round. In the 29th round Norrköping secured their Allsvenskan spot by winning at home against Örebro 2–0 while Falkenberg lost the Halland derby against Halmstad 4–0 on the road. With both Mjällby and Gefle also losing their games in the 29th round, Mjällby needed to beat Falkenberg in the away game in the last round to ensure survival by making it to the relegation play–offs. Falkenberg needed one point to be sure to avoid the relegation play-offs altogether while Gefle needed to take more points than Mjällby to avoid direct relegation. In the last round Gefle beat Helsingborg at home 2–1 while Falkenberg and Mjällby drew 1–1. This meant that Mjällby finished in 15th place and were relegated together with Brommapojkarna while Gefle finished in 14th place and qualified for the relegation play-offs against third place 2014 Superettan team Ljungskile SK.

IFK Göteborg finished as league runners-up after winning their remaining three matches in the race for the two qualifying spots for the 2015–16 UEFA Europa League, AIK grasped the last spot by finishing ahead of Elfsborg on goal difference. Brommapojkarna hosted Elfsborg in an emotional last game of the season as both clubs had lost team members to cancer during the last month of the season. Newly promoted Örebro SK proved to be one of the big surprises of the season as they finished in 6th place. The other promoted Superettan team and first time Allsvenskan contenders Falkenberg finished in 13th placed and managed to stay in the league. IFK Göteborg's Lasse Vibe became the league top scorer with 23 goals during the season while Markus Rosenberg of Malmö FF made the most assists with 14. Both Rosenberg and Vibe also amounted to the most points with 29. The favourite to become top scorer Magnus Eriksson of Malmö FF scored five goals.

=== Allsvenskans stora pris ===
For the second year running, the broadcaster of Allsvenskan, C More Entertainment, hosted an award ceremony where they presented seven awards and two special awards to the players and staff of the 16 Allsvenskan clubs, the award ceremony was held on 6 November 2014. The nominations for the 2014 season were officially announced on 3 November 2014. Nominees are displayed below, the winners are marked in bold text. Malmö FF received the most nominations with eight nominations while IFK Göteborg received four nominations and AIK, Helsingborgs IF and IF Elfsborg received two nominations. Djurgårdens IF, Falkenbergs FF and Örebro SK received one nomination each. Notably none of the players and managers from last years season awards were nominated.

Goalkeeper of the year

- **Robin Olsen** (Malmö FF)
- Kenneth Høie (Djurgårdens IF)
- Kevin Stuhr Ellegaard (IF Elfsborg)

Defender of the year

- **Johan Larsson** (IF Elfsborg)
- Filip Helander (Malmö FF)
- Erik Johansson (Malmö FF)

Midfielder of the year

- **Emil Forsberg** (Malmö FF)
- Nabil Bahoui (AIK)
- Markus Halsti (Malmö FF)

Forward of the year

- **Markus Rosenberg** (Malmö FF)
- Lasse Vibe (IFK Göteborg)
- David Accam (Helsingborgs IF)

Newcomer of the year

- **Gustav Engvall** (IFK Göteborg)
- Ludwig Augustinsson (IFK Göteborg)
- Patrik Carlgren (AIK)

Manager of the year

- **Åge Hareide** (Malmö FF)
- Henrik Larsson (Falkenbergs FF)
- Alexander Axén (Örebro SK)

Most valuable player of the year

- **Markus Rosenberg** (Malmö FF)
- Lasse Vibe (IFK Göteborg)
- David Accam (Helsingborgs IF)

== Suspended matches ==
=== Helsingborgs IF vs. Djurgårdens IF ===
The season-opening match at Olympia between Helsingborgs IF and Djurgårdens IF on 30 March 2014 was abandoned after 42 minutes of play, with the score at that time being 1–1. Djurgården fans invaded the pitch after reports that a Djurgården fan had died from injuries sustained in an assault outside the arena before the beginning of the match. The assault occurred at the Kärnan medieval tower. The death of the 43-year-old man was confirmed by the Skåne police. This was the first football-related death in Sweden since 2002, when IFK Göteborg supporter Tony Deogan was killed in Stockholm in a clash with AIK supporters. Another four people sustained injuries in connection to the match. On 14 April 2014, the Swedish Football Association's (SFA) disciplinary committee decided that the match would not continue and that it would end with the score at the time of interruption, 1–1. According to the committee, the decision was taken in respect of the man killed.

Two days after the death, a 28-year-old man from Helsingborg was arrested. On 16 June 2014, the Helsingborg District Court sentenced him to eight months in prison for assault and involuntary manslaughter.

== Teams ==
A total of sixteen teams contested the league, including fourteen sides from the 2013 season and two promoted teams from the 2013 Superettan. Two of the three promoted teams for the 2013 season managed to stay in the league, IF Brommapojkarna and Halmstads BK.

Östers IF and Syrianska FC were relegated at the end of the 2013 season after finishing in the bottom two places of the table. They were replaced by 2013 Superettan champions Falkenbergs FF and runners-up Örebro SK. Falkenberg participated in the league for the first time in the club's history, they were the first new club in Allsvenskan's history since Syrianska FC in 2011. Örebro returned to Allsvenskan after one-year absence, having been relegated at the end of the 2012 season. This was Örebro's 46th season in the league.

Halmstads BK as 14th-placed team retained their Allsvenskan spot after winning against third-placed Superettan team GIF Sundsvall 3–2 on aggregate in a relegation/promotion playoff. This was notably a replay of the 2012 play-off where Sundsvall lost their Allsvenskan spot to Halmstad.

=== Stadia and locations ===
Locations of the 2014 Allsvenskan teams

Team	Location	Stadium	Turf^{1}	Stadium capacity^{1}
AIK	Stockholm	Friends Arena	Natural	54,000
BK Häcken	Gothenburg	Gamla Ullevi	Natural	18,900
Djurgårdens IF	Stockholm	Tele2 Arena	Artificial	33,000
Falkenbergs FF	Falkenberg	Falkenbergs IP	Natural	5,000
Gefle IF	Gävle	Strömvallen	Artificial	7,200
Halmstads BK	Halmstad	Örjans Vall	Natural	15,500
Helsingborgs IF	Helsingborg	Olympia	Natural	16,500
IF Brommapojkarna	Stockholm	Grimsta IP	Artificial	8,000
IF Elfsborg	Borås	Borås Arena	Artificial	16,899
IFK Göteborg	Gothenburg	Gamla Ullevi	Natural	18,900
IFK Norrköping	Norrköping	Idrottsparken	Artificial	15,734
Kalmar FF	Kalmar	Guldfågeln Arena	Natural	12,182
Malmö FF	Malmö	Swedbank Stadion	Natural	24,000
Mjällby AIF	Mjällby	Strandvallen	Natural	7,500
Åtvidabergs FF	Åtvidaberg	Kopparvallen	Artificial	8,000
Örebro SK	Örebro	Behrn Arena	Artificial	13,129

- ^{1} According to each club information page at the Swedish Football Association website for Allsvenskan.

=== Personnel and kits ===
Note: Flags indicate national team as has been defined under FIFA eligibility rules. Players and Managers may hold more than one non-FIFA nationality.

Team	Head coach^{1}	Captain	Kit manufacturer	Main shirt sponsor
AIK	(Sweden) Andreas Alm	(Sweden) Nils-Eric Johansson	Adidas	Åbro
BK Häcken	(Sweden) Peter Gerhardsson	(Sweden) Martin Ericsson	Nike	BRA Bygg
Djurgårdens IF	(Sweden) Per Olsson	(Sweden) Andreas Johansson	Adidas	Prioritet Finans
Falkenbergs FF	(Sweden) Henrik Larsson	(Sweden) David Svensson	Nike	Gekås Ullared
Gefle IF	(Sweden) Roger Sandberg	(Sweden) Marcus Hansson	Umbro	Sandvik
Halmstads BK	(Sweden) Jens Gustafsson	(Sweden) Richard Magyar	Puma	Various
Helsingborgs IF	(Sweden) Roar Hansen	(Sweden) Peter Larsson	Puma	Resurs Bank
IF Brommapojkarna	(Sweden) Stefan Billborn	(Sweden) Jacob Une Larsson	Adidas	Santander Group
IF Elfsborg	(Sweden) Janne Mian	(Sweden) Johan Larsson	Umbro	Various
IFK Göteborg	(Sweden) Mikael Stahre	(Sweden) Mattias Bjärsmyr	Adidas	Prioritet Finans
IFK Norrköping	(Sweden) Janne Andersson	(Sweden) Andreas Johansson	Nike	Holmen
Kalmar FF	(Sweden) Hans Eklund	(Sweden) David Elm	Puma	Småländska Hjältevadshus
Malmö FF	(Norway) Åge Hareide	(Sweden) Guillermo Molins	Puma	Rörläggaren
Mjällby AIF	(Sweden) Anders Linderoth	(Sweden) Mattias Asper	Puma	Various
Åtvidabergs FF	(Sweden) Peter Swärdh	(Sweden) Daniel Hallingström	Uhlsport	Åtvidabergs Sparbank
Örebro SK	(Sweden) Alexander Axén	(Sweden) Magnus Wikström	Puma	Various

- ^{1} According to each club information page at the Swedish Football Association website for Allsvenskan.

=== Managerial changes ===
Team	Outgoing manager	Manner of departure	Date of vacancy	Table	Incoming manager	Date of appointment
Djurgårdens IF	(Norway) Per-Mathias Høgmo	Signed by Norway	3 November 2013	Pre-season	(Sweden) Per Olsson	20 November 2013
Kalmar FF	(Sweden) Nanne Bergstrand	Resigned	3 November 2013	Pre-season	(Sweden) Hans Eklund	4 November 2013
Falkenbergs FF	(Sweden) Hans Eklund	Signed by Kalmar FF	4 November 2013	Pre-season	(Sweden) Henrik Larsson	4 December 2013
Gefle IF	(Sweden) Per Olsson	Signed by Djurgårdens IF	20 November 2013	Pre-season	(Sweden) Roger Sandberg	10 December 2013
Malmö FF	(Sweden) Rikard Norling	Resigned	27 November 2013	Pre-season	(Norway) Åge Hareide	9 January 2014
IF Brommapojkarna	(Sweden) Roberth Björknesjö	Resigned	30 November 2013	Pre-season	(Sweden) Stefan Billborn	6 December 2013
Örebro SK	(Sweden) Per-Ola Ljung	Signed by GAIS	13 June 2014	11th	(Sweden) Alexander Axén	13 June 2014
Mjällby AIF	(Sweden) Lars Jacobsson	Sacked	19 July 2014	14th	(Sweden) Anders Linderoth	21 July 2014
IF Elfsborg	(Sweden) Klas Ingesson	Death	29 October 2014	4th	(Sweden) Janne Mian	29 October 2014

== League table ==
Pos	Team	Pld	W	D	L	GF	GA	GD	Pts	Qualification or relegation
1	Malmö FF (C)	30	18	8	4	59	31	+28	62	Qualification to Champions League second qualifying round
2	IFK Göteborg	30	15	11	4	58	34	+24	56	Qualification to Europa League second qualifying round (Note: IFK Göteborg qualified for the UEFA Europa League second qualifying round by winning 2014–15 Svenska Cupen.)
3	AIK	30	15	7	8	59	42	+17	52	Qualification to Europa League first qualifying round (Note: IF Elfsborg qualified for the UEFA Europa League first qualifying round as the fourth-placed team since IFK Göteborg, winners of the 2014–15 Svenska Cupen, already qualified based on league position.)
4	IF Elfsborg	30	15	7	8	40	31	+9	52	Qualification to Europa League first qualifying round
5	BK Häcken	30	13	7	10	58	45	+13	46	
6	Örebro SK	30	13	7	10	54	44	+10	46	
7	Djurgårdens IF	30	11	10	9	47	33	+14	43	
8	Åtvidabergs FF	30	12	7	11	39	46	−7	43	
9	Helsingborgs IF	30	10	9	11	41	44	−3	39	
10	Halmstads BK	30	11	6	13	44	50	−6	39	
11	Kalmar FF	30	10	9	11	36	45	−9	39	
12	IFK Norrköping	30	9	9	12	39	50	−11	36	
13	Falkenbergs FF	30	9	6	15	37	49	−12	33	
14	Gefle IF (O)	30	8	8	14	34	42	−8	32	Qualification to Relegation play-offs
15	Mjällby AIF (R)	30	8	5	17	29	47	−18	29	Relegation to Superettan
16	IF Brommapojkarna (R)	30	2	6	22	28	69	−41	12	Relegation to Superettan

Source: svenskfotboll.se (in Swedish)
Rules for classification: 1) points; 2) goal difference; 3) number of goals scored; 4) head-to-head points; 5) head-to-head goal difference; 6) head-to-head away goals scored
(C) Champions; (O) Play-off winners; (R) Relegated

=== Positions by round ===
Note: Some matches were played out of phase with the corresponding round, positions were corrected in hindsight.

Team ╲ Round	1	2	3	4	5	6	7	8	9	10	11	12	13	14	15	16	17	18	19	20	21	22	23	24	25	26	27	28	29	30
Malmö FF	1	1	1	1	1	1	1	1	1	1	1	1	1	1	1	1	1	1	1	1	1	1	1	1	1	1	1	1	1	1
IFK Göteborg	3	9	9	4	6	5	6	6	5	6	6	6	5	6	5	6	6	6	6	5	5	4	4	4	3	2	2	2	2	2
AIK	14	10	10	7	10	9	7	7	6	5	5	4	3	2	2	2	2	2	2	2	2	2	2	2	4	4	4	4	3	3
IF Elfsborg	13	6	6	5	2	2	3	2	2	2	2	2	4	4	6	4	4	3	4	3	3	3	3	3	2	3	3	3	4	4
BK Häcken	2	7	11	9	3	7	4	3	4	3	4	5	6	5	3	3	3	4	3	4	4	5	5	5	5	5	5	5	5	5
Örebro SK	6	2	4	6	7	6	8	8	8	8	9	11	10	12	13	13	14	13	14	13	9	8	8	7	8	7	6	6	6	6
Djurgårdens IF	9	3	2	3	5	4	5	5	7	7	8	7	7	7	7	7	7	7	7	7	7	7	7	6	6	6	7	8	7	7
Åtvidabergs FF	5	4	3	8	9	10	9	10	9	9	7	8	8	9	9	8	9	8	8	8	11	10	9	9	9	10	9	7	8	8
Helsingborgs IF	10	14	7	12	12	11	11	12	11	10	12	10	11	10	12	11	11	14	10	10	8	11	10	10	10	8	8	9	10	9
Halmstads BK	11	16	16	16	13	13	16	16	16	14	14	15	15	15	15	15	13	11	13	12	10	9	11	11	11	11	11	10	9	10
Kalmar FF	4	5	5	2	4	3	2	4	3	4	3	3	2	3	4	5	5	5	5	6	6	6	6	8	7	9	10	11	11	11
IFK Norrköping	15	8	8	10	8	8	10	9	10	12	11	9	9	8	8	9	8	9	11	14	14	14	13	14	14	15	14	13	12	12
Falkenbergs FF	16	11	12	13	14	14	15	14	12	11	10	12	12	11	10	10	12	10	12	11	13	13	14	15	15	14	13	12	13	13
Gefle IF	7	12	13	11	11	12	12	11	13	13	13	14	13	13	11	12	10	12	9	9	12	12	12	12	13	13	12	14	14	14
Mjällby AIF	8	13	15	14	16	16	14	15	15	16	15	13	14	14	14	14	15	15	15	15	15	15	15	13	12	12	15	15	15	15
IF Brommapojkarna	12	15	14	15	15	15	13	13	14	15	16	16	16	16	16	16	16	16	16	16	16	16	16	16	16	16	16	16	16	16

Leader and 2015–16 UEFA Champions League second qualifying round
2015–16 UEFA Europa League first qualifying round
Relegation play-offs
Relegation to Superettan

Source: everysport.com

== Results ==
Home \ Away	AIK	BKH	DIF	FFF	GIF	HBK	HIF	BP	IFE	IFKG	IFKN	KFF	MFF	MAIF	ÅFF	ÖSK
AIK		1–0	1–1	3–0	3–1	0–1	2–1	4–2	2–1	0–2	1–2	3–0	2–3	2–1	4–1	1–1
BK Häcken	2–2		2–1	1–2	3–1	3–0	1–1	3–1	0–2	1–1	2–0	4–1	3–3	1–1	0–2	4–1
Djurgårdens IF	2–3	1–2		1–0	1–2	3–0	2–2	3–2	1–1	0–0	1–1	0–0	2–0	4–0	0–1	0–3
Falkenbergs FF	4–1	1–1	1–0		1–1	1–1	2–0	1–0	2–3	1–2	4–2	1–3	2–5	1–1	3–0	1–3
Gefle IF	1–2	1–0	1–1	3–1		2–0	2–1	3–0	0–1	1–1	1–2	0–2	0–0	1–0	0–1	1–2
Halmstads BK	2–2	1–4	2–1	4–0	3–2		2–1	3–0	1–1	2–2	0–0	1–1	0–1	1–2	1–3	1–2
Helsingborgs IF	3–1	4–2	1–1 (Note: The match between Helsingborgs IF and Djurgårdens IF had to be suspended following a pitch invasion by Djurgården fans after 42 minutes of play with the score 1–1. On 14 April 2014, the Swedish Football Association's (SvFF) disciplinary committee decided that the match would not continue and that the score when the original contest was suspended would be the final score of the match.)	1–0	1–1	1–4		3–1	4–1	0–3	0–0	4–1	0–1	3–1	0–0	1–1
IF Brommapojkarna	0–4	1–5	0–4	2–3	1–2	0–3	0–1		0–1	1–1	3–0	1–2	1–1	0–1	2–2	2–2
IF Elfsborg	1–1	3–1	0–1	1–0	1–0	4–1	1–0	2–2		0–0	3–0	2–0	0–1	3–1	1–0	1–0
IFK Göteborg	0–2	3–2	2–1	1–0	4–0	5–1	6–2	3–0	0–0		2–2	2–0	0–3	3–1	5–0	2–1
IFK Norrköping	2–4	0–0	3–5	0–3	1–0	1–2	2–0	3–1	4–2	3–0		0–0	1–2	1–1	2–1	2–0
Kalmar FF	1–1	2–3	0–4	3–1	2–1	1–3	2–0	1–1	0–0	1–1	2–0		1–1	2–1	2–2	2–0
Malmö FF	2–2	1–2	2–2	3–0	1–0	3–1	1–1	2–0	1–2	2–2	3–0	3–1		4–1	3–0	3–2
Mjällby AIF	1–0	1–4	0–2	1–1	2–2	2–1	1–2	0–1	1–0	3–0	3–1	0–2	0–1		1–0	0–1
Åtvidabergs FF	0–3	1–0	1–1	2–0	2–2	1–0	1–2	3–2	2–1	1–1	2–2	3–1	2–1	2–1		1–2
Örebro SK	4–2	5–2	0–1	0–0	2–2	1–2	1–1	3–1	5–1	3–4	2–2	2–0	1–2	1–0	3–2	

Source: Swedish Football Association (in Swedish)
Legend: Blue = home team win; Yellow = draw; Red = away team win.

== Relegation play-offs ==
6 November 2014
18:30 UTC+1

Ljungskile SK	1–3	Gefle IF
Olsson 12'	Report	Oremo 18' (pen.); Lantto 51'; Williams 55'

Skarsjövallen, Ljungskile
Attendance: 1,973
Referee: Michael Lerjéus (Skövde)

9 November 2014
14:30 UTC+1

Gefle IF	1–0	Ljungskile SK
Lundevall 52'	Report

Strömvallen, Gävle
Attendance: 4,228
Referee: Andreas Ekberg (Lund)

Gefle IF won 4–1 on aggregate.

== Season statistics ==
=== Top scorers ===
Rank	Player	Club	Goals
1	(Denmark) Lasse Vibe	IFK Göteborg	23
2	(Brazil) Ricardo Santos	Åtvidabergs FF	17
2	(Ghana) David Accam	Helsingborgs IF	17
4	(Sweden) Markus Rosenberg	Malmö FF	15
5	(Sweden) Emil Forsberg	Malmö FF	14
5	(Sweden) Nabil Bahoui	AIK	14
5	(Sierra Leone) Alhassan Kamara	Örebro SK	14
8	(Sweden) Henok Goitom	AIK	12

=== Top assists ===
Rank	Player	Club	Assists
1	(Sweden) Markus Rosenberg	Malmö FF	14
2	(Sweden) Nicklas Bärkroth	IF Brommapojkarna	10
3	(Costa Rica) Celso Borges	AIK	9
3	(Sweden) Stefan Karlsson	Djurgårdens IF	9
3	(Sweden) Emil Salomonsson	IFK Göteborg	9
6	(Denmark) Martin Christensen	Åtvidabergs FF	8
6	(Sweden) Simon Lundevall	Gefle IF	8
6	(Sweden) Jonathan Ring	Kalmar FF	8

=== Top goalkeepers ===
(Minimum of 10 games played)

Rank	Goalkeeper	Club	GP	GA	SV%	CS
1	(Denmark) Robin Olsen	Malmö FF	29	28	77	11
1	(Norway) Kenneth Høie	Djurgårdens IF	30	33	77	11
3	(Sweden) Emil Hedvall	Gefle IF	26	36	76	5
3	(Denmark) Kevin Stuhr Ellegaard	IF Elfsborg	28	24	76	12
5	(Sweden) Jacob Rinne	Örebro SK	11	16	75	2
5	(Sweden) John Alvbåge	IFK Göteborg	19	21	75	7
5	(Sweden) Mattias Asper	Mjällby AIF	30	47	75	5
8	(Sweden) Oscar Jansson	Örebro SK	21	28	73	5
8	(Norway) Lars Cramer	Kalmar FF	22	28	73	6

=== Hat-tricks ===
Player	For	Against	Result	Date
(Denmark) Lasse Vibe	IFK Göteborg	Åtvidabergs FF	5–0	17 April 2014
(Sweden) Emil Forsberg	Malmö FF	Åtvidabergs FF	3–0	12 July 2014
(Denmark) Lasse Vibe	IFK Göteborg	Mjällby AIF	3–1	20 July 2014
(Brazil) Ricardo Santos	Åtvidabergs FF	IF Brommapojkarna	3–2	20 July 2014
(Sweden) Henok Goitom	AIK	Gefle IF	3–1	10 August 2014
(Sweden) Sebastian Andersson	Djurgårdens IF	IF Brommapojkarna	4–0	25 August 2014
(Ghana) Nasiru Mohammed	BK Häcken	IF Brommapojkarna	5–1	20 September 2014
(Denmark) Lasse Vibe	IFK Göteborg	Örebro SK	4–3	24 September 2014
(Sweden) Emil Forsberg	Malmö FF	Mjällby AIF	4–1	27 September 2014
(Sierra Leone) Alhassan Kamara	Örebro SK	BK Häcken	5–2	1 November 2014
(Sweden) Gustav Engvall	IFK Göteborg	Halmstads BK	5–1	1 November 2014

=== Scoring ===
- First goal of the season: Aleksandar Prijović for Djurgårdens IF against Helsingborgs IF (30 March 2014)
- Largest winning margin: 5 goals
  - IFK Göteborg 5–0 Åtvidabergs FF (17 April 2014)
- Highest scoring game: 8 goals
  - IFK Göteborg IF 6–2 Helsingborgs IF (6 July 2014)
  - IFK Norrköping 3–5 Djurgårdens IF (14 July 2014)
- Most goals scored in a match by a single team: 6 goals
  - IFK Göteborg IF 6–2 Helsingborgs IF (6 July 2014)
- Most goals scored in a match by a losing team: 3 goals
  - IFK Norrköping 3–5 Djurgårdens IF (14 July 2014)
  - Örebro SK 3–4 IFK Göteborg (24 September 2014)
- Fewest games failed to score in: 2
  - Malmö FF
- Most games failed to score in: 11
  - IF Brommapojkarna

=== Clean sheets ===
- Most clean sheets: 13
  - IF Elfsborg
- Fewest clean sheets: 2
  - IF Brommapojkarna

=== Discipline ===
- Worst overall disciplinary record (1 pt per yellow card, 3 pts per red card): 57
  - Mjällby AIF (51 yellow cards, 2 red cards)
- Best overall disciplinary record: 27
  - Gefle IF (27 yellow cards)
- Most yellow cards (club): 51
  - Mjällby AIF
- Most yellow cards (player): 8
  - Markus Rosenberg (Malmö FF)
  - Ibrahim Moro (AIK)
  - Patrik Haginge (Örebro SK)
- Most red cards (club): 4
  - Kalmar FF
- Most red cards (player): 2
  - Kjetil Wæhler (IFK Göteborg)
  - Alexander Faltsetas (Djurgårdens IF)
  - Joseph Baffo (Halmstads BK)
  - Jacob Une Larsson (IF Brommapojkarna)
- Most fouls (player): 54
  - Gustav Sandberg Magnusson (IF Brommapojkarna)

=== Attendance ===
Club	Home		Away		Total	
Club	Average	Total	Average	Total	Average	Total
AIK	16,446	246,693	8,649	129,735	12,548	376,428
Malmö FF	14,090	211,357	9,582	143,723	11,836	355,080
Djurgårdens IF	13,145	197,178	8,575	128,626	10,860	325,804
IFK Göteborg	10,739	161,078	9,799	146,979	10,269	308,057
Helsingborgs IF	8,344	125,164	7,270	109,044	7,807	234,208
IF Elfsborg	8,031	120,472	6,897	103,456	7,464	223,928
Örebro SK	6,729	100,935	6,317	94,753	6,523	195,688
Kalmar FF	6,144	92,154	6,234	93,511	6,189	185,665
IFK Norrköping	5,888	88,314	6,497	97,456	6,192	185,770
Halmstads BK	4,652	69,786	6,588	98,824	5,620	168,610
Åtvidabergs FF	4,036	60,543	6,271	94,066	5,154	154,609
Mjällby AIF	3,878	58,171	6,043	90,639	4,960	148,810
Gefle IF	3,751	56,262	5,807	87,108	4,779	143,370
Falkenbergs FF	3,672	55,078	6,828	102,424	5,250	157,502
BK Häcken	2,820	42,298	6,194	92,917	4,507	135,215
IF Brommapojkarna	1,749	26,239	6,564	98,461	4,157	124,700
League					7,132	1,711,722

== See also ==
Competitions

- 2014 Superettan
- 2014 Division 1
- 2013–14 Svenska Cupen

Team seasons

- 2014 AIK season
- 2014 BK Häcken season
- 2014 Djurgårdens IF season
- 2014 IFK Göteborg season
- 2014 Malmö FF season

Transfers

- List of Swedish football transfers winter 2013–14
