= 2014 Djurgårdens IF season =

Djurgården
2014 season
- Manager: Per Olsson
- Stadium: Tele2 Arena
- Allsvenskan: 7th
- Svenska Cupen: Group stage
- Top goalscorer: League: Erton Fejzullahu (9); All: Erton Fejzullahu (10)
- Highest home attendance: 25,175 (16 April vs AIK, Allsvenskan)
- Lowest home attendance: 2,798 (16 March vs Halmstads BK, Svenska Cupen)
- Average home league attendance: 13,145
Home colours	Away colours

In the 2014 season, Djurgårdens IF competed in the Allsvenskan and Svenska Cupen. Per Olsson took over from Per-Mathias Høgmo as manager, after the Norwegian left the club to coach the Norway national football team. Djurgården finished 7th in Allsvenskan and in the groups stage of Svenska Cupen

== Squad information ==
=== Squad ===
- updated November 7, 2014.

N	Pos.	Nat.	Name	Age	EU	Since	App	Goals	Ends	Transfer fee	Notes
2	LB	(Sweden)	Jesper Arvidsson	41	EU	2013	46	1	2015	Free	
3	CB	(Sweden)	Fredrik Stenman	43	EU	2014	108	9	2015	Free	
5	RB	(Sweden)	Stefan Karlsson	37	EU	2014	34	0	2016	Undisclosed	
6	CM	(Sweden)	Alexander Faltsetas	39	EU	2014	30	3	2016	Undisclosed	Second nationality: (Greece) GRE
7	RW	(Sweden)	Martin Broberg	36	EU	2012	67	5	2015	Undisclosed	
8	CM	(Sweden)	Andreas Johansson (captain)	48	EU	2012	191	56	2014	Free	
9	RW	(Bosnia and Herzegovina)	Haris Radetinac	41	EU	2013	37	8	2015	Undisclosed	Second nationality: (Sweden) SWE
11	FW	(Sweden)	Amadou Jawo	42	EU	2013	63	20	2018	Undisclosed	Second nationality: (The Gambia) GAM
12	GK	(Norway)	Kenneth Høie	47	EU	2012	83	0	2016	Undisclosed	
13	CB	(Sweden)	Emil Bergström (vice-captain)	33	EU	2011	111	6	2017	Youth system	
14	CB	(Sweden)	Mattias Östberg	49	EU	2012	35	1	2014	Undisclosed	
15	MF	(South Africa)	Mark Mayambela	39	Non-EU	2014	19	1	2016	Free	
16	FW	(Sweden)	Sebastian Andersson	35	EU	2014	14	7	2016	Undisclosed	
17	MF	(South Africa)	Xolani Mdaki	34	Non-EU	2014	1	0	2014	Free	
19	MF	(Sweden)	Nahir Oyal	35	EU	2012	19	1	2015	Undisclosed	Second nationality: (Turkey) TUR
20	MF	(Sweden)	Simon Tibbling	32	EU	2011	81	3	2016	Youth system	
22	MF	(Sweden)	Philip Hellquist	35	EU	2008	120	14	2014	Youth system	
23	GK	(Sweden)	Hampus Nilsson	36	EU	2013	2	0	2018	Free	
32	MF	(Sweden)	Tim Söderström	32	EU	2013	4	0	?	Youth system	
33	DF	(Sweden)	Jakob Glasberg	31	EU	2014	0	0	?	Youth system	
34	DF	(Sweden)	Frej Ersa Engberg	31	EU	2014	0	0	?	Youth system	
36	RB	(Sweden)	Philip Sparrdal Mantilla	33	EU	2011	6	0	2014	Youth system	
39	MF	(Sweden)	Christian Rubio Sivodedov	29	EU	2014	6	0	?	Youth system	Second nationality: (Russia) RUS

=== Transfers ===
==== In ====
No.	Pos.	Nat.	Name	Age	EU	Moving from	Type	Transfer window	Ends	Transfer fee	Source
5	RB	(Sweden)	Stefan Karlsson	25	EU	Östers IF	End of contract	Winter	2016		dif.se
6	CM	(Sweden)	Alexander Faltsetas	26	EU	Gefle IF	End of contract	Winter	2016		dif.se
11	FW	(Sweden)	Amadou Jawo	29	EU	IF Elfsborg	Transfer	Winter	2018	Undisclosed	dif.se
15	MF	(South Africa)	Mark Mayambela	26	Non-EU	Mpumalanga Black Aces (South Africa)	Transfer	Winter	2016	Free	dif.se
3	DF	(Sweden)	Fredrik Stenman	31	EU	Club Brugge (Belgium)	Transfer	Summer	2015	Free	dif.se
16	FW	(Sweden)	Sebastian Andersson	23	EU	Kalmar FF	Transfer	Summer	2017	Undisclosed	dif.se
17	MF	(South Africa)	Xolani Mdaki	22	Non-EU	Mamelodi Sundowns (South Africa)	Loan	Summer	2014	loan	

==== Out ====
No.	Pos.	Nat.	Name	Age	EU	Moving to	Type	Transfer window	Transfer fee	Source
9	FW	(Argentina)	Luis Solignac	22	Non-EU	IFK Mariehamn (Finland)	End of loan	Winter		dif.se
15	LW	(United States)	Brian Span	21	Non-EU	FC Dallas (United States)	End of contract	Winter		dif.se
	FW	(Sierra Leone)	Ike Fofanah	19	Non-EU		End of contract	Winter		dif.se
	MF	(Sweden)	Trimi Makolli	21	EU		End of contract	Winter		dif.se
	MF	(Sweden)	Saša Matić	20	EU		End of contract	Winter		dif.se
	MF	(Sweden)	Kristijan Cosić	19	EU		End of contract	Winter		dif.se
5	LB	(Sweden)	Petter Gustafsson	28	EU	Åtvidabergs FF	End of contract	Winter		dif.se
17	LB	(Sweden)	Joel Riddez	33	EU		End of contract	Winter		dif.se
	FW	(Sierra Leone)	Alhaji Kamara	19	Non-EU	IFK Norrköping	End of contract	Winter		dif.se
25	LW	(Sweden)	Sebastian Rajalakso	25	EU	Jagiellonia Białystok (Poland)	End of contract	Winter		dif.se
23	CB	(Sweden)	Daniel Jarl	21	EU	Landskrona BoIS	End of contract	Winter		dif.se
18	FW	(Ghana)	Godsway Donyoh	19	Non-EU	Manchester City (England)	End of loan	Winter		dif.se
16	FW	(Brazil)	Pablo Dyego	19	Non-EU	Fluminense (Brazil)	End of loan	Winter		dif.se
6	FW	(Denmark)	Peter Nymann	31	EU	Vestsjælland (Denmark)	End of contract	Winter		dif.se
19	LW	(Sweden)	Nahir Oyal	23	EU	Şanlıurfaspor (Turkey)	Loan	Winter		dif.se
18	LW	(Ghana)	Daniel Amartey	19	Non-EU	Copenhagen (Denmark)	Transfer	Summer	£1,580,000	dif.se
17	MF	(Ghana)	Yussif Chibsah	30	Non-EU	Alanyaspor (Turkey)	Transfer	Summer	Undisclosed	dif.se
10	FW	(Kosovo)	Erton Fejzullahu	25	EU	Beijing Sinobo Guoan (China)	Loan	Summer		dif.se
27	DF	(Lithuania)	Vytautas Andriuskevicius	23	Non-EU	Cambuur (Netherlands)	Transfer	Summer	Undisclosed	dif.se
28	FW	(Switzerland)	Aleksandar Prijović	24	EU	Boluspor (Turkey)	Transfer	Summer	Undisclosed	dif.se

== Incidents ==
=== Helsingborgs IF vs. Djurgårdens IF ===
The season-opening Allsvenskan match at Olympia against Helsingborgs IF on 30 March 2014 was abandoned after 42 minutes of play, with the score at that time being 1–1. Djurgården fans invaded the pitch after reports that a Djurgården fan had died from injuries sustained in an assault outside the arena before the beginning of the match. The assault occurred at the Kärnan medieval tower. The death of the 43-year-old man was confirmed by the Skåne police. This was the first football-related death in Sweden since 2002, when IFK Göteborg supporter Tony Deogan was killed in Stockholm in a clash with AIK supporters. Another four people also sustained injuries in connection to the match. The decision was made to abandon the match. On 14 April 2014, the Swedish Football Association's (SFA) disciplinary committee decided that the match would not continue and that it would end with the score 1–1. According to the committee, the decision was taken in respect of the man killed.

Two days after the death, a 28-year-old man from Helsingborg was arrested. On 16 June 2014, the Helsingborg District Court sentenced him to eight months in prison for assault and involuntary manslaughter.

== Club ==
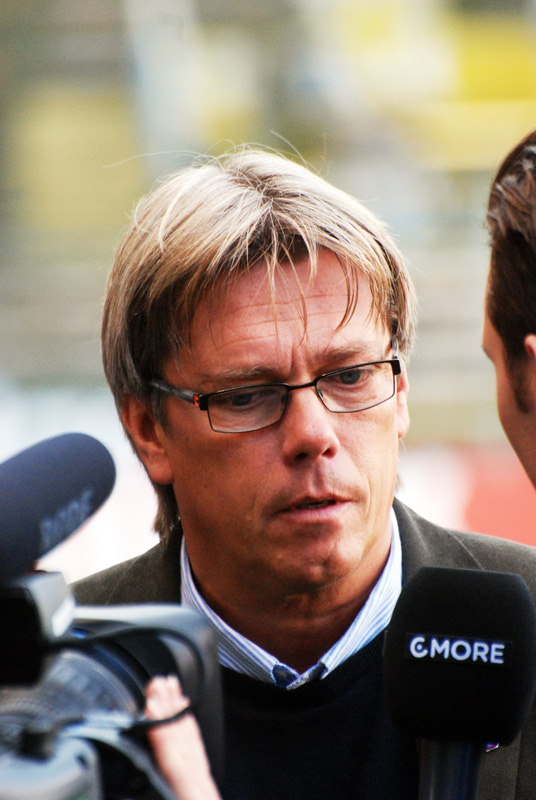
The 2014 season will be Per Olsson's first season with Djurgården.

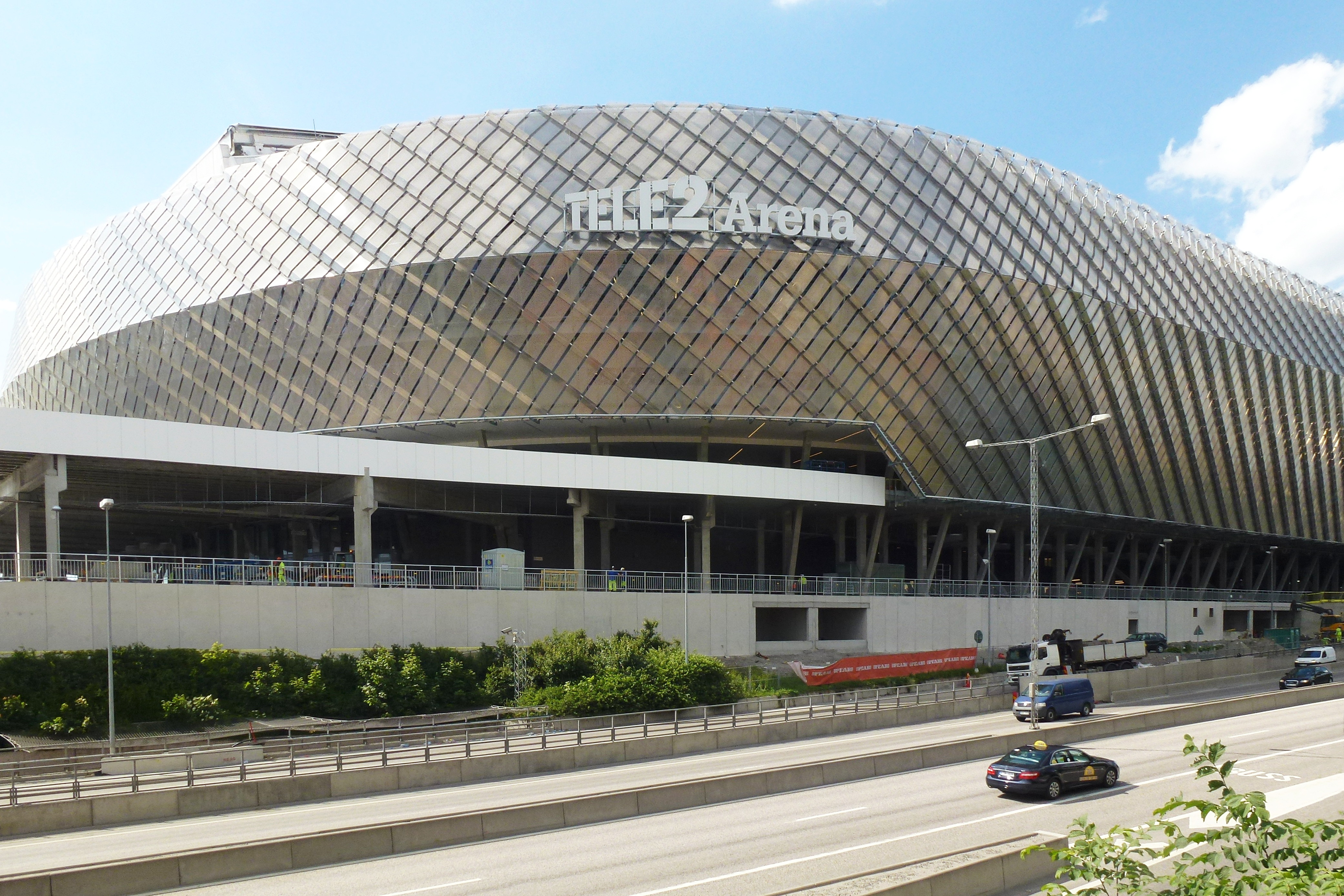
Tele2 Arena is the second largest stadium in Allsvenskan.

=== Coaching staff ===
Name	Role
(Sweden) Per Olsson	Head coach
(Sweden) Anders Johansson	Assistant coach
(Sweden) Kjell Frisk	Goalkeeping coach
(Sweden) Christian Schumacher	Physiotherapist
(Sweden) Christian Andersson	Naprapath
(Sweden) Bengt Sparrelid	Club doctor
(Sweden) Johan Fallby	Psychologist
(Sweden) Inge Lindström	Equipment manager

=== Other information ===
Chairman	(Sweden) Henrik Berggren
Director of Sports	(Sweden) Bo Andersson
Ground (capacity and dimensions)	Tele2 Arena (33,000 / 105x68 m)

Source: Djurgårdens IF Fotboll and Tele2 Arena

== Player statistics ==
Appearances for competitive matches only. Updated as of 29 October 2014

No.	Pos	Nat	Player	Total		Allsvenskan		2013–14 Svenska Cupen 2014–15 Svenska Cupen	
No.	Pos	Nat	Player	Apps	Goals	Apps	Goals	Apps	Goals
2	DF	(Sweden) SWE	Jesper Arvidsson	24	1	20	1	4	0
3	DF	(Sweden) SWE	Fredrik Stenman	14	0	13	0	1	0
5	DF	(Sweden) SWE	Stefan Karlsson	34	0	30	0	4	0
6	MF	(Sweden) SWE	Alexander Faltsetas	30	3	26	2	4	1
7	MF	(Sweden) SWE	Martin Broberg	31	4	27	4	4	0
8	MF	(Sweden) SWE	Andreas Johansson	25	4	21	1	4	3
9	MF	(Bosnia and Herzegovina) BIH	Haris Radetinac	26	7	24	6	2	1
10	FW	(Sweden) SWE	Erton Fejzullahu	15	10	13	9	2	1
11	FW	(Sweden) SWE	Amadou Jawo	32	7	29	6	3	1
12	GK	(Norway) NOR	Kenneth Høie	33	0	30	0	3	0
13	DF	(Sweden) SWE	Emil Bergström	33	3	30	2	3	1
14	DF	(Sweden) SWE	Mattias Östberg	7	0	4	0	3	0
15	MF	(South Africa) RSA	Mark Mayambela	19	1	15	1	4	0
16	FW	(Sweden) SWE	Sebastian Andersson	14	7	13	6	1	1
17	MF	(Ghana) GHA	Yussif Chibsah	12	0	10	0	2	0
17	MF	(South Africa) RSA	Xolani Mdaki	1	0	0	0	1	0
18	DF	(Ghana) GHA	Daniel Amartey	12	0	11	0	1	0
19	MF	(Sweden) SWE	Nahir Oyal	0	0	0	0	0	0
20	MF	(Sweden) SWE	Simon Tibbling	33	1	30	1	3	0
22	MF	(Sweden) SWE	Philip Hellquist	19	3	17	2	2	1
23	GK	(Sweden) SWE	Hampus Nilsson	1	0	0	0	1	0
27	DF	(Lithuania) LTU	Vytautas Andriuškevičius	15	0	15	0	0	0
28	FW	(Switzerland) SUI	Aleksandar Prijović	19	5	17	5	2	0
30	GK	(Sweden) SWE	Eric Dahlgren	0	0	0	0	0	0
32	MF	(Sweden) SWE	Tim Söderström	2	0	0	0	2	0
33	DF	(Sweden) SWE	Jakob Glasberg	0	0	0	0	0	0
34	DF	(Sweden) SWE	Frej Ersa Engberg	0	0	0	0	0	0
35	MF	(Sweden) SWE	Christian Rubio Sivodedov	6	0	6	0	0	0
36	DF	(Sweden) SWE	Philip Sparrdal Mantilla	0	0	0	0	0	0

=== Goals ===
Rank	Player	League	Cup	Total
1	(Sweden) Erton Fejzullahu	9	1	10
2	(Sweden) Amadou Jawo	6	1	7
3	(Sweden) Sebastian Andersson	6	1	7
4	(Bosnia and Herzegovina) Haris Radetinac	6	1	7
5	(Switzerland) Aleksandar Prijović	5	0	5
6	(Sweden) Andreas Johansson	1	3	4
7	(Sweden) Martin Broberg	4	0	4
8	(Sweden) Emil Bergström	2	1	3
9	(Sweden) Alexander Faltsetas	3	0	3
10	(Sweden) Philip Hellquist	2	1	3
11	(Sweden) Jesper Arvidsson	1	0	1
12	(South Africa) Mark Mayambela	1	0	1
13	(Sweden) Simon Tibbling	1	0	1

=== Assists ===
Rank	Player	League	Cup	Total
1	(Sweden) Stefan Karlsson	9	0	9
2	(Sweden) Martin Broberg	3	3	6
3	(Bosnia and Herzegovina) Haris Radetinac	6	0	6
4	(Sweden) Simon Tibbling	4	0	4
5	(Sweden) Amadou Jawo	3	0	3
6	(South Africa) Mark Mayambela	2	1	3
7	(Sweden) Andreas Johansson	1	1	2
8	(Sweden) Jesper Arvidsson	1	1	2
9	(Switzerland) Aleksandar Prijović	1	0	1
10	(Sweden) Erton Fejzullahu	1	0	1
11	(Sweden) Emil Bergström	1	0	1

== Competitions ==
=== Overall ===
Competition	Started round	Current position / round	Final position / round	First match	Last match
Allsvenskan	—	—		30 March 2014	2 November 2014
Svenska Cupen	—	Group stage		21 August 2013	

Source: Competitions

=== Allsvenskan ===
==== League table ====
Pos	Team	Pld	W	D	L	GF	GA	GD	Pts
5	BK Häcken	30	13	7	10	58	45	+13	46
6	Örebro SK	30	13	7	10	54	44	+10	46
7	Djurgårdens IF	30	11	10	9	47	33	+14	43
8	Åtvidabergs FF	30	12	7	11	39	46	−7	43
9	Helsingborgs IF	30	10	9	11	41	44	−3	39

Source: svenskfotboll.se (in Swedish)
Rules for classification: 1) points; 2) goal difference; 3) number of goals scored; 4) head-to-head points; 5) head-to-head goal difference; 6) head-to-head away goals scored

==== Results summary ====
Overall								Home						Away					
Pld	W	D	L	GF	GA	GD	Pts	W	D	L	GF	GA	GD	W	D	L	GF	GA	GD
30	11	10	9	47	33	+14	43	5	5	5	21	17	+4	6	5	4	26	16	+10

Source: svenskfotboll.se (in Swedish)

==== Results by round ====
Round	1	2	3	4	5	6	7	8	9	10	11	12	13	14	15	16	17	18	19	20	21	22	23	24	25	26	27	28	29	30
Ground	A	H	A	H	A	H	A	H	A	H	A	A	H	A	H	A	H	A	A	H	A	H	H	A	H	A	H	H	A	H
Result	D	W	W	L	D	W	D	D	L	D	D	W	D	W	L	L	D	L	D	W	W	W	L	W	W	L	L	L	W	D
Position	9	3	2	3	5	4	5	5	7	7	8	7	7	7	7	7	7	7	7	7	7	7	7	6	6	6	7	8	7	7

Source: see below
A = Away; H = Home; W = Win; D = Draw; L = Loss

==== Matches ====
Kickoff times are in UTC+2 unless stated otherwise.

30 March 2014 Round 1	Helsingborgs IF	1 – 1 (Note: The season-opening match at Olympia between Helsingborgs IF and Djurgårdens IF on 30 March 2014 was abandoned after 42 minutes of play, with the score at that time being 1–1. Djurgården fans invaded the pitch after reports that a Djurgården fan had died from injuries sustained in an assault outside the arena before the beginning of the match. The assault occurred at the Kärnan medieval tower. The death of the 43-year-old man was confirmed by the Skåne police. This was the first football-related death in Sweden since 2002, when IFK Göteborg supporter Tony Deogan was killed in Stockholm in a clash with AIK supporters. Another four people also sustained injuries in connection to the match. The decision was made to abandon the match. On 14 April 2014, the Swedish Football Association's (SFA) disciplinary committee decided that the game would not continue and that it would end with the score 1–1. According to the committee, the decision was taken in respect of the man killed.)	Djurgårdens IF	Helsingborg
15:00	Accam 20'		Prijović 13'	Stadium: Olympia; Attendance: 13,632; Referee: Martin Hansson

6 April 2014 Round 2	Djurgårdens IF	3 – 0	Halmstad BK	Stockholm
14:30	Broberg 32'; Prijović 53'; Jawo 79'			Stadium: Tele2 Arena; Attendance: 12,155; Referee: Stefan Johannesson

11 April 2014 Round 3	Mjällby AIF	0 – 2	Djurgårdens IF	Hällevik
19:00		Report	Jawo 55'; Fejzullahu 68'	Stadium: Strandvallen; Attendance: 2,721; Referee: Michael Lerjéus

16 April 2014 Round 4	Djurgårdens IF	2 – 3	AIK	Stockholm
19:00	Fejzullahu 82' (pen.); Radetinac 90+4'	Report	Lorentzson 24'; Bahoui 55'; Markkanen 65'	Stadium: Tele2 Arena; Attendance: 25,175; Referee: Jonas Eriksson

21 April 2014 Round 5	Malmö FF	2 – 2	Djurgårdens IF	Malmö
17:30	Molins 45'; Eriksson 47'	Report	Radetinac 15'; Fejzullahu 71'	Stadium: Swedbank Stadion; Attendance: 14,315; Referee: Bojan Pandžić (Gothenburg)

27 April 2014 Round 6	Djurgårdens IF	3 – 2	IF Brommapojkarna	Stockholm
15:00	Fejzullahu 38', 41'; Prijović 83'	Report	Petrovic 49'; Une Larsson 68'	Stadium: Tele2 Arena; Attendance: 11,698; Referee: Andreas Ekberg

4 May 2014 Round 7	Åtvidabergs FF	1 – 1	Djurgårdens IF	Åtvidaberg
15:00	Ricardo Santos 6'	Report	Broberg 24'	Stadium: Kopparvallen; Attendance: 4,953; Referee: Martin Hansson

7 May 2014 Round 8	Djurgårdens IF	0 – 0	Kalmar FF	Stockholm
19:00		Report		Stadium: Tele2 Arena; Attendance: 10,641; Referee: Johan Hamlin

12 May 2014 Round 9	Falkenbergs FF	1 – 0	Djurgårdens IF	Falkenberg
19:00	Donyoh 90+3'	Report		Stadium: Falkenbergs IP; Attendance: 3,376; Referee: Kristoffer Karlsson

21 May 2014 Round 10	Djurgårdens IF	0 – 0	IFK Göteborg	Stockholm
19:05		Report		Stadium: Tele2 Arena; Attendance: 18,044; Referee: Jonas Eriksson (Sigtuna)

26 May 2014 Round 11	Gefle IF	1 – 1	Djurgårdens IF	Gävle
19:00	Hansson 67'	Report	Jawo 50'	Stadium: Strömvallen; Attendance: 4,199; Referee: Michael Lerjéus

30 May 2014 Round 12	Örebro SK	0 – 1	Djurgårdens IF	Örebro
19:00		Report	Bergström 84'	Stadium: Behrn Arena; Attendance: 9,512; Referee: Glenn Nyberg

7 July 2014 Round 13	Djurgårdens IF	1 – 1	IF Elfsborg	Stockholm
19:05	Fejzullahu 45+1' (pen.)	Report	Claesson 37'	Stadium: Tele2 Arena; Attendance: 11,471; Referee: Markus Strömbergsson

14 July 2014 Round 14	IFK Norrköping	3 – 5	Djurgårdens IF	Norrköping
19:05	Traustason 1'; Kujović 64'; Nyman 69'	Report	Fejzullahu 5', 75'; Jawo 8'; Radetinac 49'; Prijović 82'	Stadium: Nya Parken; Attendance: 7,022; Referee: Martin Hansson

21 July 2014 Round 15	Djurgårdens IF	1 – 2	BK Häcken	Stockholm
19:05	Fejzullahu 74'	Summary	Standberg 11'; Ericsson 21'	Stadium: Tele2 Arena; Attendance: 11,361; Referee: Michael Lerjeus

28 July 2014 Round 16	BK Häcken	2 – 1	Djurgårdens IF	Gothenburg
19:05	Makondele 6' 18'	Summary	Hellquist 27'	Stadium: Gamla Ullevi; Attendance: 3,027; Referee: Andreas Ekberg

4 August 2014 Round 17	Djurgårdens IF	2 – 2	Helsingborgs IF	Stockholm
19:00	Faltsetas 6'; Prijović 88'	Summary	Bojanić 37'; Accam 56'	Stadium: Tele2 Arena; Attendance: 12,988; Referee: Markus Strömbergsson

10 August 2014 Round 18	Halmstads BK	2 – 1	Djurgårdens IF	Halmstad
15:00	Blomberg 30'; Steindórsson 45+1'	Summary	Broberg 34'	Stadium: Örjans Vall; Attendance: 5,794; Referee: Mohammed Al-Hakim

13 August 2014 Round 19	AIK	1 – 1	Djurgårdens IF	Solna
19:05	Bahoui 54'	Summary	Per Karlsson 60' (o.g.)	Stadium: Friends Arena; Attendance: 28,240; Referee: Michael Lerjeus

18 August 2014 Round 20	Djurgårdens IF	4 – 0	Mjällby AIF	Stockholm
19:00	Faltsetas 25'; Jawo 45+1'; Radetinac 50'; Bergström 63'	Report		Stadium: Tele2 Arena; Attendance: 9,120; Referee: Andreas Ekberg

25 August 2014 Round 21	IF Brommapojkarna	0 – 4	Djurgårdens IF	Stockholm
19:05		Report	Andersson 10', 60', 78'; Jawo 56'	Stadium: Tele2 Arena; Attendance: 3,857; Referee: Stefan Johannesson

31 August 2014 Round 22	Djurgårdens IF	2 – 0	Malmö FF	Stockholm
17:30	Radetinac 10'; Andersson 36'	Report		Stadium: Tele2 Arena; Attendance: 24,529; Referee: Jonas Eriksson

14 September 2014 Round 23	Djurgårdens IF	0 – 1	Åtvidaberg	Stockholm
17:30		Report	Ricardo Santos 26'	Stadium: Tele2 Arena; Attendance: 13,402; Referee: Glenn Nyberg

21 September 2014 Round 24	Kalmar FF	0 – 4	Djurgårdens IF	Kalmar
15:00		Report	Arvidsson 19'; Johansson 74'; Andersson 76'; Hellquist 87'	Stadium: Guldfågeln Arena; Attendance: 5,369; Referee: Markus Strömbergsson

24 September 2014 Round 25	Djurgårdens IF	1 – 0	Falkenberg	Stockholm
19:00	Mayambela 82'	Report		Stadium: Tele2 Arena; Attendance: 7,865; Referee: Andreas Ekberg

29 September 2014 Round 26	IFK Göteborg	2 – 1	Djurgårdens IF	Gothenburg
19:05	Vibe 7'; Smedberg-Dalence 60'	Report	Andersson 77'	Stadium: Gamla Ullevi; Attendance: 11,159; Referee: Martin Strömbergsson (Gävle)

4 October 2014 Round 27	Djurgårdens IF	1 – 2	Gefle IF	Stockholm
16:00	Tibbling 79'	Report	Bellander 7'; Lundevall 84' (pen.)	Stadium: Tele2 Arena; Attendance: 11,166; Referee: Stefan Johannesson

20 October 2014 Round 28	Djurgårdens IF	0 – 3	Örebro SK	Stockholm
19:00		Report	Kamara 19'; Pode 54'; Holmberg 86'	Stadium: Tele2 Arena; Attendance: 7,454; Referee: Andreas Ekberg

25 October 2014 Round 29	IF Elfsborg	0 – 1	Djurgårdens IF	Borås
17:30		Report	Radetinac 52'	Stadium: Borås Arena; Attendance: 11,450; Referee: Markus Strömbergsson

2 November 2014 Round 30	Djurgårdens IF	1 – 1	IFK Norrköping	Stockholm
15:00	Broberg 61'	Report	Kamara 4'	Stadium: Tele2 Arena; Attendance: 10,109; Referee: Kristoffer Karlsson

=== Svenska Cupen ===
==== 2013–14 ====
The tournament continued from the 2013 season.

Kickoff times are in UTC+2.

===== Group stage =====
Pos	Team	Pld	W	D	L	GF	GA	GD	Pts	Qualification	IKS	DIF	HBK	AFF
1	IK Sirius	3	3	0	0	6	2	+4	9	Advance to Knockout stage	—	2–1	2–1	—
2	Djurgårdens IF	3	2	0	1	7	3	+4	6		—	—	4–1	2–0
3	Halmstads BK	3	1	0	2	4	6	−2	3		—	—	—	2–0
4	Assyriska FF	3	0	0	3	0	6	−6	0		0–2	—	—	—

2 March 2014 Matchday 1	IK Sirius	2 – 1	Djurgårdens IF	Uppsala
15:00	Arvidsson 53' (o.g.); Runnemo 58'	Report	Fejzullahu 34'	Stadium: Lötens IP; Attendance: 3,295; Referee: Mohammed Al-Hakim

9 March 2014 Matchday 2	Djurgårdens IF	2 – 0	Assyriska FF	Stockholm
15:00	Johansson 16', 81' (pen.)	Report		Stadium: Tele2 Arena; Attendance: 3,152; Referee: Jonas Eriksson

16 March 2014 Matchday 3	Djurgårdens IF	4 – 1	Halmstad BK	Stockholm
15:00	Johansson 11'; Bergström 36'; Liverstam 53' (o.g.); Radetinac 76'	Report	Antonsson 72'	Stadium: Tele2 Arena; Attendance: 2,798; Referee: Markus Strömbergsson

==== 2014–15 ====
The tournament continues into the 2015 season.

Kickoff times are in UTC+2.

===== Qualification stage =====
3 September 2014 Round 2	Motala AIF	0 – 4	Djurgårdens IF	Motala
17:30		Report	Jawo 59'; Faltsetas 69'; Andersson 73'; Hellquist 90+2'	Stadium: Motala Idrottspark; Attendance: 2,068; Referee: Jim Pettersson

== Non competitive ==
=== Pre-season ===
Kickoff times are in UTC+2 unless stated otherwise.

25 January 2014 Friendly	Djurgårdens IF (Sweden)	1 – 1*	(Germany) Union Berlin	Stockholm
15:30	Prijović 69'	Report	Quiring 6'	Stadium: Tele2 Arena; Attendance: 8,000; Referee: Jonas Eriksson

1 February 2014 Friendly	Djurgårdens IF (Sweden)	7 – 0	(Finland) IFK Mariehamn	Stockholm
15:00	Östberg 22'; Jawo 58'; Radetinac 59'; Prijović 63' (pen.), 87'; Glasberg 81'; Hellquist 90'	Report		Stadium: Stadshagens IP; Attendance: 1,000; Referee: Stefan Johannesson

9 February 2014 Friendly	Djurgårdens IF (Sweden)	2 – 0	(Sweden) Degerfors IF	Stockholm
14:00	Fejzullahu 16' (pen.), 82'	Report		Stadium: Stadshagens IP; Attendance: 1,000; Referee: Björn Särnbrink

13 February 2014 Friendly	Rosenborg BK (Norway)	2 – 1	(Sweden) Djurgårdens IF	(Norway) Hommelvik
19:00	Søderlund 34'; Bille Nielsen 65' (pen.)	Report	Broberg 78'	Stadium: Abrahallen

19 February 2014 Friendly	Lokomotiv Moscow (Russia)	4 – 0	(Sweden) Djurgårdens IF	(Spain) Marbella
17:00	Broberg 4' (o.g.); Tkachyov 57'; Pavlyuchenko 62'; Ďurica 65'	Report		Stadium: Marbella Football Center; Attendance: 100; Referee: José García

24 February 2014 Friendly	Spartak Moscow (Russia)	0 – 2	(Sweden) Djurgårdens IF	(Spain) Málaga
20:00		Report	54' Fejzullahu; 86' Östberg	Stadium: Estadio Ciudad de Málaga
