= Mayambela =

Mayambela is a surname. Notable people with the surname include:

- Mark Mayambela (born 1987), South African footballer, brother of Mihlali
- Mihlali Mayambela (born 1996), South African footballer
