= Samuel Gustafson =

Swedish footballer

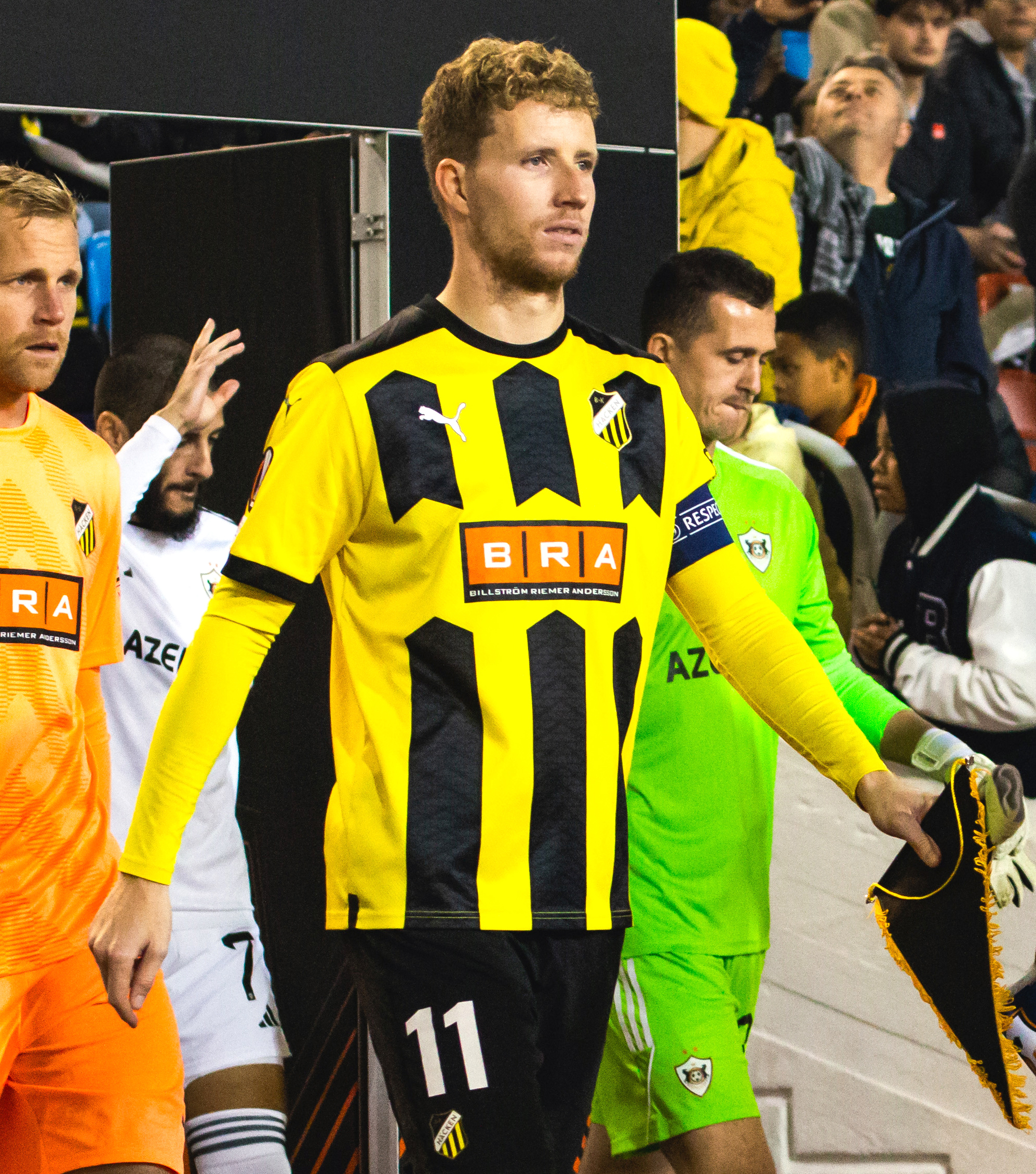

Personal information
- Full name: Samuel Gustafson
- Date of birth: 11 January 1995 (age 31)
- Place of birth: Mölndal, Sweden
- Height: 1.87 m (6 ft 2 in)
- Position: Midfielder

Team information
- Current team: Urawa Red Diamonds
- Number: 11

Youth career
- –2013: Fässbergs IF

Senior career*
Years	Team	Apps	(Gls)
2013–2016	BK Häcken	68	(12)
2016–2019	Torino	9	(0)
2018	→ Perugia (loan)	20	(1)
2018–2019	→ Hellas Verona (loan)	31	(1)
2019–2021	Cremonese	52	(0)
2021–2023	BK Häcken	61	(2)
2024–	Urawa Red Diamonds	71	(5)

International career^{‡}
2015–2016	Sweden U21	7	(2)
2022–2024	Sweden	13	(0)
- * Club domestic league appearances and goals as of 18:11, 8 Nov 2026 (UTC) ‡ National team caps and goals as of 20:31, 25 March 2024 (UTC)

Samuel Gustafson (born 11 January 1995) is a Swedish professional footballer who plays as a midfielder for J1 League club Urawa Red Diamonds.

== Club career ==
On 2 September 2019, he signed a multi-year contract with the Serie B club Cremonese.

On 9 July 2021, he returned to BK Häcken on a three-year contract.

On 29 December 2023, Gustafson signed for J1 League side Urawa Red Diamonds on a permanent transfer, where he was reunited with manager Per-Mathias Høgmo, who left BK Häcken a few days earlier. Gustafson made his debut for the club, starting the whole game, in a 2-0 lost against Sanfrecce Hiroshima in the opening game of the season.

== International career ==
Gustafson represented the Sweden U21 team a total of seven times between 2015 and 2016. He made his full international debut for Sweden on 16 November 2022 in a friendly game against Mexico, playing the full 90 minutes in a 2–1 win.

== Personal life ==
Gustafson's twin brother, Simon Gustafson, also a footballer, was Samuel's teammate at BK Häcken.

== Career statistics ==
=== Club ===
As of match played 6 June 2026

Appearances and goals by club, season and competition
Club	Season	League			National Cup		Continental		Other		Total	
Club	Season	Division	Apps	Goals	Apps	Goals	Apps	Goals	Apps	Goals	Apps	Goals
Häcken	2013	Allsvenskan	2	1	3	2	—		—		5	3
Häcken	2014	Allsvenskan	21	3	6	1	—		—		27	4
Häcken	2015	Allsvenskan	27	5	6	0	—		—		33	5
Häcken	2016	Allsvenskan	17	3	0	0	2 (Note: Appearances in UEFA Europa League)	0	—		19	3
Häcken	Total		67	12	15	3	2	0	—		84	15
Torino	2016–17	Serie A	5	0	1	0	—		—		6	0
Torino	2017–18	Serie A	4	0	1	0	—		—		5	0
Torino	Total		9	0	2	0	—		—		11	0
Perugia (loan)	2017–18	Serie B	20	1	1	0	—		—		21	1
Hellas Verona (loan)	2018–19	Serie B	31	1	2	0	—		—		33	1
Cremonese	2019–20	Serie B	19	0	0	0	—		—		19	0
Cremonese	2020–21	Serie B	33	0	2	0	—		—		35	0
Cremonese	Total		52	0	2	0	—		—		54	0
Häcken	2021	Allsvenskan	4	0	0	0	—		—		4	0
Häcken	2022	Allsvenskan	28	1	0	0	—		—		28	1
Häcken	2023	Allsvenskan	29	1	6	1	14 (Note: Four appearances in UEFA Champions League, ten appearances and one goal in UEFA Europa League)	1	—		49	3
Häcken	Total		61	2	6	1	14	1	—		81	4
Urawa Red Diamonds	2024	J1 League	28	2	—		—		1 (Note: Appearance in J.League Cup)	0	29	2
Urawa Red Diamonds	2025	J1 League	32	3	2	0	—		3 (Note: Appearances in FIFA Club World Cup)	0	37	3
Urawa Red Diamonds	2026	J1 League	6	0	—		—		—		6	0
Urawa Red Diamonds	Total		66	5	2	0	—		4	0	72	5
Career total			306	21	30	4	16	1	4	0	356	26

=== International ===
Appearances and goals by national team and year
National team	Year	Apps	Goals
Sweden	2022	2	0
Sweden	2023	9	0
Sweden	2024	2	0
Total		13	0

== Honours ==
BK Häcken

- Allsvenskan: 2022
- Svenska Cupen: 2015–16, 2022–23
