= 2014 BK Häcken season =

Swedish football club season

The 2014 season is BK Häcken's 74th in existence and their 14th season in Allsvenskan. They competed in Allsvenskan and 2013–14 Svenska Cupen.

== Competitions ==
=== Allsvenskan ===
==== League table ====
| Pos | Team | Pld | W | D | L | GF | GA | GD | Pts | Qualification or relegation |
|---|---|---|---|---|---|---|---|---|---|---|
| 3 | AIK | 30 | 15 | 7 | 8 | 59 | 42 | +17 | 52 | Qualification to Europa League first qualifying round (Note: IF Elfsborg qualified for the UEFA Europa League first qualifying round as the fourth-placed team since IFK Göteborg, winners of the 2014–15 Svenska Cupen, already qualified based on league position.) |
| 4 | IF Elfsborg | 30 | 15 | 7 | 8 | 40 | 31 | +9 | 52 | Qualification to Europa League first qualifying round |
| 5 | BK Häcken | 30 | 13 | 7 | 10 | 58 | 45 | +13 | 46 | |
| 6 | Örebro SK | 30 | 13 | 7 | 10 | 54 | 44 | +10 | 46 | |
| 7 | Djurgårdens IF | 30 | 11 | 10 | 9 | 47 | 33 | +14 | 43 | |

Source: svenskfotboll.se (in Swedish)
Rules for classification: 1) points; 2) goal difference; 3) number of goals scored; 4) head-to-head points; 5) head-to-head goal difference; 6) head-to-head away goals scored

==== Matches ====
| 31 March 2014 Round 1 | BK Häcken | 2 – 0 | IFK Norrköping | Gothenburg |
| 19:00 | Ericsson 48'; El Kabir 54' | Report | | Stadium: Gamla Ullevi; Attendance: 2,437; Referee: Mohammed Al Hakim |

| 4 April 2014 Round 2 | IF Elfsborg | 3 – 1 | BK Häcken | Borås |
| 19:00 | Svensson 72'; Larsson 78'; Nilsson 90+3' (pen.) | Report | Makondele 83' | Stadium: Borås Arena; Attendance: 9,138; Referee: Jonas Eriksson |

| 13 April 2014 Round 3 | Helsingborgs IF | 4 – 2 | BK Häcken | Helsingborg |
| 17:30 | Sadiku 7'; Smárason 55', 90+2'; Accam 78' | Report | El Kabir 10'; Ericsson 22' (pen.) | Stadium: Olympia; Attendance: 6,132; Referee: Andreas Ekberg |

| 16 April 2014 Round 4 | BK Häcken | 3 – 0 | Halmstads BK | Gothenburg |
| 19:00 | El Kabir 5'; Simon Gustafson 16'; Mohammed 79' | Report | | Stadium: Gamla Ullevi; Attendance: 1,943; Referee: Kristoffer Karlsson |

| 20 April 2014 Round 5 | Mjällby AIF | 1 – 4 | BK Häcken | Sölvesborg |
| 17:30 | Håkansson 82' | Report | Simon Gustafson 20', 80'; Standberg 29'; Makondele 32' | Stadium: Strandvallen; Attendance: 2,618; Referee: Glenn Nyberg |

| 27 April 2014 Round 6 | BK Häcken | 2 – 2 | AIK | Gothenburg |
| 17:30 | El Kabir 51'; Strandberg 75' | Report | Borges 45', 61' | Stadium: Gamla Ullevi; Attendance: 2,813; Referee: Johan Hamlin |

| 4 May 2014 Round 7 | Malmö FF | 1 – 2 | BK Häcken | Malmö |
| 15:00 | Halsti 67' | Report | El Kabir 3', 7' | Stadium: Swedbank Stadion; Attendance: 10,626; Referee: Markus Strömbergsson |

| 7 May 2014 Round 8 | BK Häcken | 3 – 1 | IF Brommapojkarna | Gothenburg |
| 19:00 | Simon Gustafson 23'; Strandberg 60'; Anklev 90+2' | Report | Rexhepi 26' | Stadium: Gamla Ullevi; Attendance: 1,572; Referee: Kristoffer Karlsson |

| 12 May 2014 Round 9 | Åtvidaberg | 1 – 0 | BK Häcken | Åtvidaberg |
| 19:00 | Owoeri 69' | Report | | Stadium: Kopparvallen; Attendance: 2,421; Referee: Stefan Johannesson |

| 20 May 2014 Round 10 | BK Häcken | 4 – 1 | Kalmar FF | Gothenburg |
| 19:00 | El Kabir 1'; Mohammed 25'; Strandberg 88' | Report | Ring 10' | Stadium: Gamla Ullevi; Attendance: 2,863; Referee: Glenn Nyberg |

| 24 May 2014 Round 11 | Falkenberg | 1 – 1 | BK Häcken | Falkenberg |
| 16:00 | Wede 67' | Report | Makondele 3' | Stadium: Falkenbergs IP; Attendance: 3,059; Referee: Kristoffer Karlsson |

| 2 June 2014 Round 12 | BK Häcken | 1 – 1 | IFK Göteborg | Gothenburg |
| 19:00 | Simon Gustafson 47' | Report | Zuta 16' (o.g.) | Stadium: Gamla Ullevi; Attendance: 10,579; Referee: Andreas Ekberg |

| 5 July 2014 Round 13 | Gefle IF | 1 – 0 | BK Häcken | Gävle |
| 16:00 | Lundevall 90+2' | Report | | Stadium: Strömvallen; Attendance: 2,918; Referee: Mohammed Al Hakim |

| 13 July 2014 Round 14 | BK Häcken | 4 – 1 | Örebro SK | Gothenburg |
| 18:00 | Ericsson 12'; Jeremejeff 48'; Makondele 57'; Anklev 80' | Report | Pode 1' | Stadium: Gamla Ullevi; Attendance: 2,876; Referee: Markus Strömbergsson |

| 21 July 2014 Round 15 | Djurgårdens IF | 1 – 2 | BK Häcken | Stockholm |
| 19:00 | Fejzullahu 74' | Report | Strandberg 11'; Ericsson 21' | Stadium: Tele2 Arena; Attendance: 11,361; Referee: Michael Lerjéus |

=== 2013–14 Svenska Cupen ===
| Pos | Team | Pld | W | D | L | GF | GA | GD | Pts | Qualification | BKH | MAIF | ÖIS | SIF |
|---|---|---|---|---|---|---|---|---|---|---|---|---|---|---|
| 1 | BK Häcken | 3 | 3 | 0 | 0 | 9 | 1 | +8 | 9 | Advance to Knockout stage | — | 3–0 | 2–0 | — |
| 2 | Mjällby AIF | 3 | 2 | 0 | 1 | 3 | 3 | 0 | 6 | | — | — | 2–0 | — |
| 3 | Örgryte IS | 3 | 1 | 0 | 2 | 2 | 5 | −3 | 3 | | — | — | — | 2–1 |
| 4 | Sandvikens IF | 3 | 0 | 0 | 3 | 2 | 7 | −5 | 0 | | 1–4 | 0–1 | — | — |
