= Viggbyholms IK FF =

Swedish football club

- Full name: Viggbyholms Idrottsklubb Fotbollsförening
- Nicknames: VIK, Viggan
- Founded: 1930
- Ground: Hägernäs IP, Hägernäs, Täby
- Chairman: Tommy Erlandsson
- Head coach: Roger Sandberg
- Coach: Joakim Olausson
- League: Division 2 Norra Svealand
- 2024: Division 2 Norra Svealand, 3rd of 14
Home colours	Away colours

Viggbyholms IK FF is a Swedish football club located in Viggbyholm, which is a neighbourhood of Täby in Stockholm County. They play their home matches at the Hägernäs IP in Täby.

Viggbyholms IK FF are affiliated with Stockholms Fotbollförbund.

== History ==
The first sports club was formed in Viggbyholmsvägen on 5 June 1921. The club was called Viggbyholms Idrottsklubb and at the outset specialised in football and general sports. The club later introduced bandy and skiing but by 1928 Viggbyholms IK had ceased to operate. A new club called Viggbyholms SK was founded on 30 October 1930 by a group of teenagers that wished to resurrect the defunct community sports club. The main activities were football and bandy and the new club recorded several successes.

On 1 April 1945 a long discussed merger took place between Gribbylunds SK and Viggbyholms IF. The name of the revamped club was Viggbyholms IK and a host of new activities were adopted including handball. Football was a core activity in the club right from the beginning but was closed for some years in the 1940s before being revived in 1948. In the early 1950s the club gained use of the Hägernäs IP which had been a military area till then.

Viggbyholms IK has participated mainly in the lower divisions of the Swedish football league system, fluctuating between Division 5 and Division 8. In 2010 the club gained promotion from Division 4 and currently plays in Division 3 Norra Svealand which is the fifth tier of Swedish football.

In October 2024, Viggbyholm manager Roberth Björknesjö was hired by Allsvenskan team Djurgården as a caretaker manager. For the 2025 season, Roger Sandberg took over the club.

== Recent history ==
In recent seasons Viggbyholms IK have competed in the following divisions:

2011 – Division 3 Norra Svealand
2010 – Division 4 Stockholm Norra
2009 – Division 4 Stockholm Norra
2008 – Division 4 Stockholm Norra
2007 – Division 4 Stockholm Norra
2006 – Division 4 Stockholm Norra
2005 – Division 4 Stockholm Norra
2004 – Division 4 Stockholm Norra
2003 – Division 5 Stockholm Norra
2002 – Division 5 Stockholm Norra
2001 – Division 5 Stockholm Norra
2000 – Division 5 Stockholm Norra
1999 – Division 6 Stockholm A

== Attendances ==
In recent seasons Viggbyholms IK have had the following average attendances:

Season	Average attendance	Division / Section	Level
2009	Not available	Div 4 Stockholm Norra	Tier 6
2010		Div 4 Stockholm Norra	Tier 6

* Attendances are provided in the Publikliga sections of the Svenska Fotbollförbundet website.
