= Vasalund IF =

Association football club in Sweden

- Full name: Vasalund Idrottsförening
- Founded: 1934; 92 years ago
- Ground: Skytteholms IP, Solna, Stockholm
- Capacity: 4,000
- Chairman: Niclas Fröberg
- Manager: Janne Mian
- League: Ettan Norra
- 2025: Ettan Norra, 3rd of 16
Home colours	Away colours

Vasalund IF is a Swedish football club based in Solna, Stockholm. The club is affiliated with Stockholms Fotbollförbund.

== History ==
Vasalund was formed in 1934 and play in the Swedish Third Division: Ettan Norra. In 2002 the club merged with Essinge IK and changed its name to Vasalund/Essinge IF. The merger was discontinued and the original name was restored before the 2008 season.

== Season to season ==
Season	Level	Division	Section	Position	Movements
1951-52	Tier 4	Division 4	Östsvenska	3rd	
1952-53	Tier 4	Division 4	Östsvenska	2nd	Promoted
1953-54	Tier 3	Division 3	Östra Svealand	6th	
1954-55	Tier 3	Division 3	Östra Svealand	2nd	
1955-56	Tier 3	Division 3	Östra Svealand	7th	
1956-57	Tier 3	Division 3	Östra Svealand	1st	Promoted
1957-58	Tier 2	Division 2	Svealand	10th	Relegated
1959	Tier 3	Division 3	Östra Svealand	9th	Relegated
1960	Tier 4	Division 4	Stockholm Norra	6th	
1961	Tier 4	Division 4	Stockholm Norra	12th	Relegated
1962	Tier 5	Division 5	Norra	5th	
1963	Tier 5	Division 5	Norra	4th	
1964	Tier 5	Division 5	Norra	4th	
1965	Tier 5	Division 5	Norra	2nd	Promoted
1966	Tier 4	Division 4	Stockholm Norra	8th	
1967	Tier 4	Division 4	Stockholm Norra	3rd	
1968	Tier 4	Division 4	Stockholm/Uppland	5th	
1969	Tier 4	Division 4	Stockholm/Uppland	7th	
1970	Tier 4	Division 4	Stockholm/Uppland	3rd	
1971	Tier 4	Division 4	Stockholm/Uppland	2nd	
1972	Tier 4	Division 4	Stockholm/Uppland	4th	
1973	Tier 4	Division 4	Stockholm Norra	7th	
1974	Tier 4	Division 4	Stockholm Norra	1st	Promoted
1975	Tier 3	Division 3	Östra Svealand	4th	
1976	Tier 3	Division 3	Östra Svealand	1st	Promoted
1977	Tier 2	Division 2	Norra	10th	
1978	Tier 2	Division 2	Norra	10th	
1979	Tier 2	Division 2	Norra	5th	
1980	Tier 2	Division 2	Norra	3rd	
1981	Tier 2	Division 2	Norra	3rd	
1982	Tier 2	Division 2	Norra	5th	
1983	Tier 2	Division 2	Norra	8th	
1984	Tier 2	Division 2	Norra	7th	
1985	Tier 2	Division 2	Norra	9th	
1986	Tier 2	Division 2	Norra	6th	
1987	Tier 2	Division 1	Norra	11th	
1988	Tier 2	Division 1	Norra	3rd	
1989	Tier 2	Division 1	Norra	2nd	
1990	Tier 2	Division 1	Norra	2nd	
1991	Tier 2	Division 1	Vårettan Östra/Höstettan Norra	2nd/1st	Promotion Playoffs, Round 1 - Not Promoted
1992	Tier 2	Division 1	Vårettan Östra/Höstettan Norra	2nd/2nd	
1993	Tier 2	Division 1	Norra	2nd	Promotion Playoffs - Not Promoted
1994	Tier 2	Division 1	Norra	4th	
1995	Tier 2	Division 1	Norra	3rd	
1996	Tier 2	Division 1	Norra	10th	
1997	Tier 2	Division 1	Norra	14th	Relegated
1998	Tier 3	Division 2	Östra Svealand	4th	
1999	Tier 3	Division 2	Östra Svealand	2nd	
2000	Tier 3	Division 2	Västra Svealand	10th	Relegation Playoffs - Relegated
2001	Tier 4	Division 3	Norra Svealand	3rd	
2002	Tier 4	Division 3	Norra Svealand	1st	Promoted
2003	Tier 3	Division 2	Östra Svealand	7th	(Vasalund/Essinge IF)
2004	Tier 3	Division 2	Östra Svealand	2nd	(Vasalund/Essinge IF)
2005	Tier 3	Division 2	Östra Svealand	2nd	Promoted (Vasalund/Essinge IF)
2006*	Tier 3	Division 1	Norra	4th	(Vasalund/Essinge IF)
2007	Tier 3	Division 1	Norra	3rd	(Vasalund/Essinge IF)
2008	Tier 3	Division 1	Norra	2nd	Promotion Playoffs - Promoted
2009	Tier 2	Superettan		16th	Relegated
2010	Tier 3	Division 1	Norra	5th	
2011	Tier 3	Division 1	Norra	6th	
2012	Tier 3	Division 1	Norra	4th	
2013	Tier 3	Division 1	Norra	7th	
2014	Tier 3	Division 1	Norra	5th	
2015	Tier 3	Division 1	Norra	11th	
2016	Tier 3	Division 1	Norra	2nd	Promotion Playoffs - Not Promoted
2017	Tier 3	Division 1	Norra	12th	Relegated
2018	Tier 4	Division 2	Norra Svealand	1st	Promoted
2019	Tier 3	Division 1	Norra	6th	
2020	Tier 3	Ettan	Norra	1st	Promoted
2021	Tier 2	Superettan		15th	Relegated
2022	Tier 3	Ettan	Norra	3rd	
2023	Tier 3	Ettan	Norra	4th	
2024	Tier 3	Ettan	Norra	5th	
2025	Tier 3	Ettan	Norra	3rd	

* League restructuring in 2006 resulted in a new division being created at Tier 3 and subsequent divisions dropping a level.

== Cup (Svenska Cupen) ==
Season	Round
2012/13	Round 1
2013/14	Round 2
2014/15	Round 2
2015/16	Round 1
2016/17	Round 1
2017/18	Group stage
2018/19	Round 1
2019/20	Round 1
2020/21	Round 2
2021/22	Round 2
2022/23	Round 2
2023/24	Round 1
2024/25	Round 1
2025/26	Round 1
2026/27	Round 2

== Attendances ==
In recent seasons Vasalund IF have had the following average attendances:

Season	Average attendance	Division / Section	Level
2005	297	Div 2 Östra Svealand	Tier 3
2006	431	Div 1 Norra	Tier 3
2007	549	Div 1 Norra	Tier 3
2008	492	Div 1 Norra	Tier 3
2009	720	Superettan	Tier 2
2010	313	Div 1 Norra	Tier 3
2011	336	Div 1 Norra	Tier 3
2012	299	Div 1 Norra	Tier 3
2013	229	Div 1 Norra	Tier 3
2014	217	Div 1 Norra	Tier 3
2015	338	Div 1 Norra	Tier 3
2016	261	Div 1 Norra	Tier 3
2017	237	Div 1 Norra	Tier 3
2018	174	Div 2 Norra Svealand	Tier 4
2019	229	Div 1 Norra	Tier 3
2020	0	Ettan Norra	Tier 3
2021	230	Superettan	Tier 2
2022	269	Ettan Norra	Tier 3
2023	299	Ettan Norra	Tier 3

* Attendances are provided in the Publikliga sections of the Svenska Fotbollförbundet website.

== Squad ==
As of 5 September, 2026

Note: Flags indicate national team as defined under FIFA eligibility rules; some limited exceptions apply. Players may hold more than one non-FIFA nationality.

No.	Pos.	Nation	Player
1	GK	ISL	Sindri Kristinn Ólafsson
2	DF	SWE	Liam Källman
3	DF	SWE	Kalle Björklund
4	DF	SWE	Marcus Degerlund
5	DF	SWE	Petter Soelberg
6	MF	SWE	Ludvig Lundvall
7	MF	NGR	Prince Amos
8	MF	SWE	John Lundström
9	FW	SWE	Elias MacCallum
10	MF	SWE	Marko Nikolić
11	FW	PAK	Ali Khan
12	DF	SWE	Esaias Torppa
14	FW	SWE	Christopher Siwo (on loan from Djurgården)
15	MF	SWE	Filip Lukic
16	FW	SWE	Kevin Tadayon

No.	Pos.	Nation	Player
18	DF	SWE	Noel Birgoth
19	FW	SWE	Maximilian Dejene
20	DF	SWE	Melvin Vučenović Persson (on loan from Djurgården U19)
21	MF	BIH	Melvin Bajrović
22	MF	SWE	Kim Kotiram
23	DF	SWE	Theodor Gentele
24	MF	SWE	Biryan Bilgec
25	GK	SWE	Theo Graasvoll
26	DF	SWE	Tobias Westin
27	DF	SWE	Oliver Schaaf
28	DF	SWE	Martin Östergren
30	GK	SWE	Izak Stattin
35	GK	SWE	Andrei Buzdugan
37	DF	SWE	Nahom Debesay

== Coaches ==
- (Sweden) Bo Petersson (1983–84)
- (Sweden) Bo Petersson (1988–90)
- (Sweden) Erik Hamrén (1992–93)
- (Sweden) Kjell Jonevret (1993–94)
- (Sweden) Roger Palmgren (2003–2004)
- (Sweden) Bo Petersson (2004–05)
- (Sweden) Peter Lenell (2008–2009)
- (Bosnia and Herzegovina) Azrudin Valentic (2009–2011)
- (Sweden) Babar Rehman (2013–2015)
- (Sweden) Roberth Björknesjö (2015)
- (Sweden) Pascal Simpson (2016)
- (Sweden) Kalle Karlsson (2017)
- (Sweden) Carlos Banda (2017)
- (Sweden) Babar Rehman (2017)
- (Bosnia and Herzegovina) Nebojša Novaković (2018–2019)
- (Sweden) Dalibor Savic (2019–2021)
- (Sweden) Roberth Björknesjö (2021)
- (Greece) Diamantis "Akis" Vavalis (2022)
- (Sweden) Babar Rehman (2022)
- (Greece) Dimitrios Giantsis (2023)
- (Sweden) Rebaz Hassan (2024)
- (Sweden) Babar Rehman (2024-2026)
- (Sweden) Janne Mian (2026-)

== Achievements ==
=== League ===
- Ettan Norra:
  - Winners (1): 2020
  - Runners-up (4): 1989, 1990, 1993, 2008, 2016
- Division 1 Östra:
  - Runners-up (2): 1991, 1992
- Division 2 Östra Svealand:
  - Runners-up (3): 1999, 2004, 2005
- Division 2 Norra Svealand:
  - Winners (1): 2018
- Division 3 Norra Svealand:
  - Winners (1): 2002
