= Janne Mian =

Swedish football manager (born 1965)

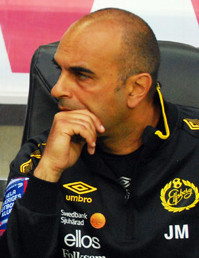

Personal information
- Full name: Jahngir Jan Mian
- Date of birth: 6 September 1965 (age 61)
- Place of birth: Sweden
- Height: 1.84 m (6 ft 0 in)

Managerial career
- Years: Team
- 2007–2010: Hammarby IF (fitness coach)
- 2014–2017: IF Elfsborg (assistant)
- 2017: IF Elfsborg
- 2019: Hammarby IF (individual coach)
- 2019: IK Frej (assistant)
- 2019–2020: IK Frej
- 2021: Hammarby TFF
- 2024–2025: IK Brage
- 2026-: Vasalunds IF

Jahngir Jan "Janne" Mian (born 6 September 1965) is a Swedish football coach. He is currently the manager of Vasalunds IF.
