= Roger Sandberg =

Swedish footballer and manager

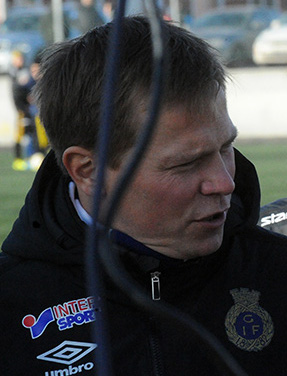

Personal information
- Full name: Hans Roger Sandberg
- Date of birth: 12 June 1972 (age 54)
- Place of birth: Luleå, Sweden
- Position: Defender

Youth career
- IFK Råneå

Senior career*
Years	Team	Apps	(Gls)
1993	IFK Luleå		
1994–1997	Umeå FC		
1998	Piteå IF		
1999–2001	Hammarby IF	63	(0)
2002–2004	Gröndals IK		

Managerial career
- 2005–2008: Gröndals IK
- 2009–2010: IF Brommapojkarna (assistant manager)
- 2011: Hammarby IF (assistant manager)
- 2011: Hammarby IF
- 2012: Hammarby IF (assistant manager)
- 2014–2016: Gefle IF
- 2025–: Viggbyholms IK
- * Club domestic league appearances and goals

Roger Sandberg (born 12 June 1972) is a Swedish football manager and former player. He was most recently the manager for Gefle IF.

On 2 June 2016 it was announced that Gefle IF had sacked Sandberg, after Gefle had just 5 points after 12 games.

For the 2025 season, Sandberg took over Viggbyholms IK.

== Honours ==
=== Player ===
Hammarby

- Allsvenskan: 2001
