= Roberth Björknesjö =

Swedish football manager

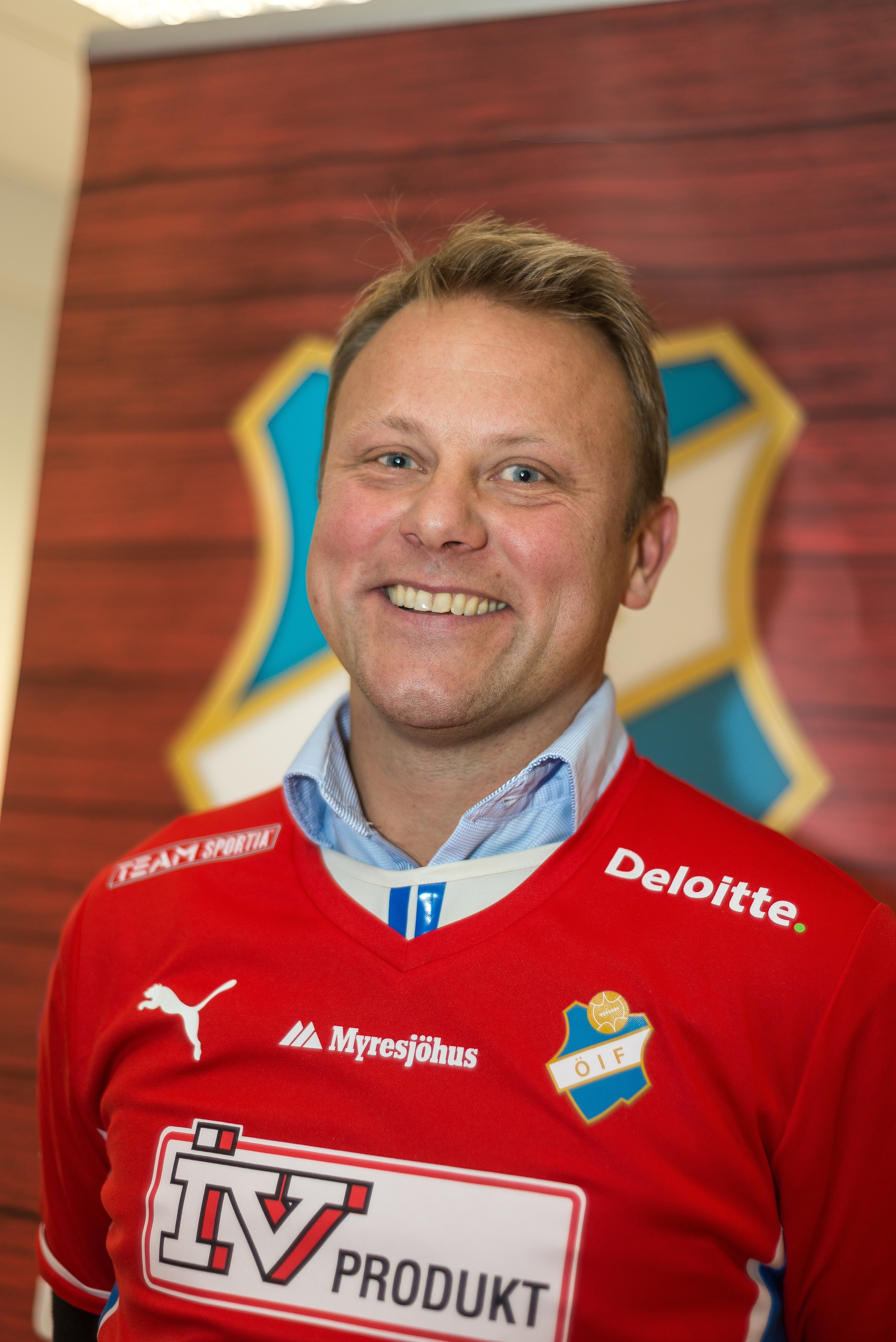
- Björknesjö in the jersey of Östers IF, December 2013.

Personal information
- Full name: Roberth Björknesjö
- Date of birth: 30 April 1973 (age 53)
- Place of birth: Stockholm, Sweden
- Position: Midfielder

Team information
- Current team: IFK Mariehamn

Youth career
- 1978–1982: Högdalens AIS
- 1983–1985: IFK Tumba
- 1986–1989: Norsborgs IF
- 1990: IFK Tumba
- 1991–1992: Djurgårdens IF

Senior career*
Years	Team	Apps	(Gls)
1993–1994	Vasalunds IF		
1995	AIK	11	(3)
Total		11	(3)

Managerial career
- 1997: IFK Tumba (youth)
- 1998–1999: IFK Tumba
- 2001: Huddinge IF
- 2003: IF Brommapojkarna (assistant)
- 2004: Väsby IK
- 2005: Syrianska FC
- 2006–2007: Värtans IK
- 2008: IF Brommapojkarna (youth)
- 2009: Assyriska FF
- 2010–2013: IF Brommapojkarna
- 2014: Östers IF
- 2015: Vasalunds IF
- 2017–2018: IK Frej
- 2018–2019: IF Brommapojkarna
- 2021: Vasalunds IF
- 2022–2024: Viggbyholms IK
- 2024: Djurgårdens IF (interim)
- 2025: Östers IF
- 2026–: IFK Mariehamn
- * Club domestic league appearances and goals

Roberth Björknesjö (born 30 April 1973 in Stockholm) is a Swedish football manager, currently serving as the head coach of IFK Mariehamn in Veikkausliiga. He has been in charge of IF Brommapojkarna for several spells.

In October 2024, while managing Viggbyholms IK, Björknesjö was hired by Allsvenskan team Djurgården as a caretaker manager for the remainder of the season. He took over Östers IF in 2025.
