= Amadou Jawo =

Gambian footballer

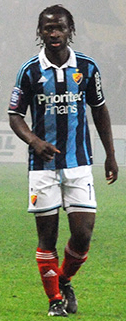

Personal information
- Date of birth: 26 September 1984 (age 42)
- Place of birth: Banjul, Gambia
- Height: 1.75 m (5 ft 9 in)
- Position: Striker

Team information
- Current team: Brottby SK
- Number: 10

Youth career
- IK Frej

Senior career*
Years	Team	Apps	(Gls)
2004–2007	Vallentuna BK	56	(9)
2008–2009	Gefle IF	41	(10)
2009–2013	IF Elfsborg	57	(8)
2013	→ Djurgårdens IF (loan)	26	(12)
2014–2018	Djurgårdens IF	56	(6)
2018	→ IK Frej (loan)	11	(0)
2019–	Brottby SK		
- * Club domestic league appearances and goals as of 30 November 2018

Amadou Jawo (born 26 September 1984) is a Gambian footballer who plays as a striker for Brottby SK in Sweden.

== Career ==
Jawo was born in Banjul, Gambia. He arrived in Sweden at the age of five and after settling down in Täby kyrkby he joined the local club IK Frej. When he was sixteen he made his first team debut for Vallentuna BK in Division 1. During his time at the club he scored 9 goals in 56 games.

At the end of 2007 Jawo trialed with Djurgårdens IF. He played two games for the Stockholm club but did not end up getting signed. In the second game where Djurgården played against Gefle IF he however impressed Gefle manager Per Olsson enough to be signed by the Gävle club instead. After two successful seasons at Gefle IF he was sold to IF Elfsborg in what was one of the most lucrative deals in the history of the club.

Jawo struggled to break into the starting eleven at Elfsborg and declared at the end of 2011 that he would not accept being a bench player for another year. The new Djurgården manager Magnus Pehrsson tried to bring Jawo to his club during several transfer windows and finally in March 2013 he joined them on a season long loan. In January 2014, Djurgården announced that Jawo had signed a 5-year contract, keeping him at the club through 2018.

On 23 April 2019, Jawo joined Brottby SK.

== Personal life ==
Jawo is of Gambian descent. He was a Djurgårdens IF supporter when he was growing up. He has a total of nine siblings. His brother Omar Jawo has played 89 games in the Swedish top tier Allsvenskan while another brother, Momodou Jawo, was a goalkeeper for IK Frej.

== Career statistics ==
As of 19 July 2016

Club performance			League		Cup		Continental		Total	
Season	Club	League	Apps	Goals	Apps	Goals	Apps	Goals	Apps	Goals
Sweden			League		Svenska Cupen		Europe		Total	
2008	Gefle IF	Allsvenskan	27	5	—		—		27	5
2009	Gefle IF	Allsvenskan	15	4	2	1	—		17	5
2009	IF Elfsborg	Allsvenskan	10	1	—		2	1	12	2
2010	IF Elfsborg	Allsvenskan	20	2	1	0	5	1	26	3
2011	IF Elfsborg	Allsvenskan	13	3	1	0	4	0	18	3
2012	IF Elfsborg	Allsvenskan	14	2	—		3	1	17	3
2013	IF Elfsborg	Allsvenskan	—		1	0	—		1	0
2013	Djurgårdens IF (loan)	Allsvenskan	26	12	5	1	—		31	13
2014	Djurgårdens IF	Allsvenskan	29	6	3	1	—		32	7
2015	Djurgårdens IF	Allsvenskan	11	0	3	1	—		14	1
2016	Djurgårdens IF	Allsvenskan	8	0	2	0	—		10	0
Career total			173	35	18	4	14	3	205	42

== Honors ==
=== Club ===
IF Elfsborg

- Allsvenskan (1): 2012

=== Individual ===
- Årets Järnkamin (1): 2013
