= Xolani Mdaki =

South African soccer player

Personal information
- Full name: Xolani Mdaki
- Date of birth: 7 July 1992 (age 34)
- Place of birth: South Africa
- Height: 1.78 m (5 ft 10 in)
- Position: Defensive midfielder

Team information
- Current team: Royal Eagles

Youth career
- Mamelodi Sundowns

Senior career*
Years	Team	Apps	(Gls)
2011–2015	Mamelodi Sundowns	0	(0)
2012–2014	→ Santos FC (loan)	41	(2)
2014	→ Djurgårdens IF (loan)	0	(0)
2015–2016	Vasco da Gama	4	(0)
2016	FC Cape Town	12	(1)
2016–2017	Chippa United	12	(0)
2017–	Royal Eagles	2	(0)
- * Club domestic league appearances and goals as of 14 February 2018

Xolani Mdaki (born 7 July 1992) is a South African soccer player who plays as a midfielder for Royal Eagles.
