= Tony Deogan =

Swedish murder victim (1975–2002)

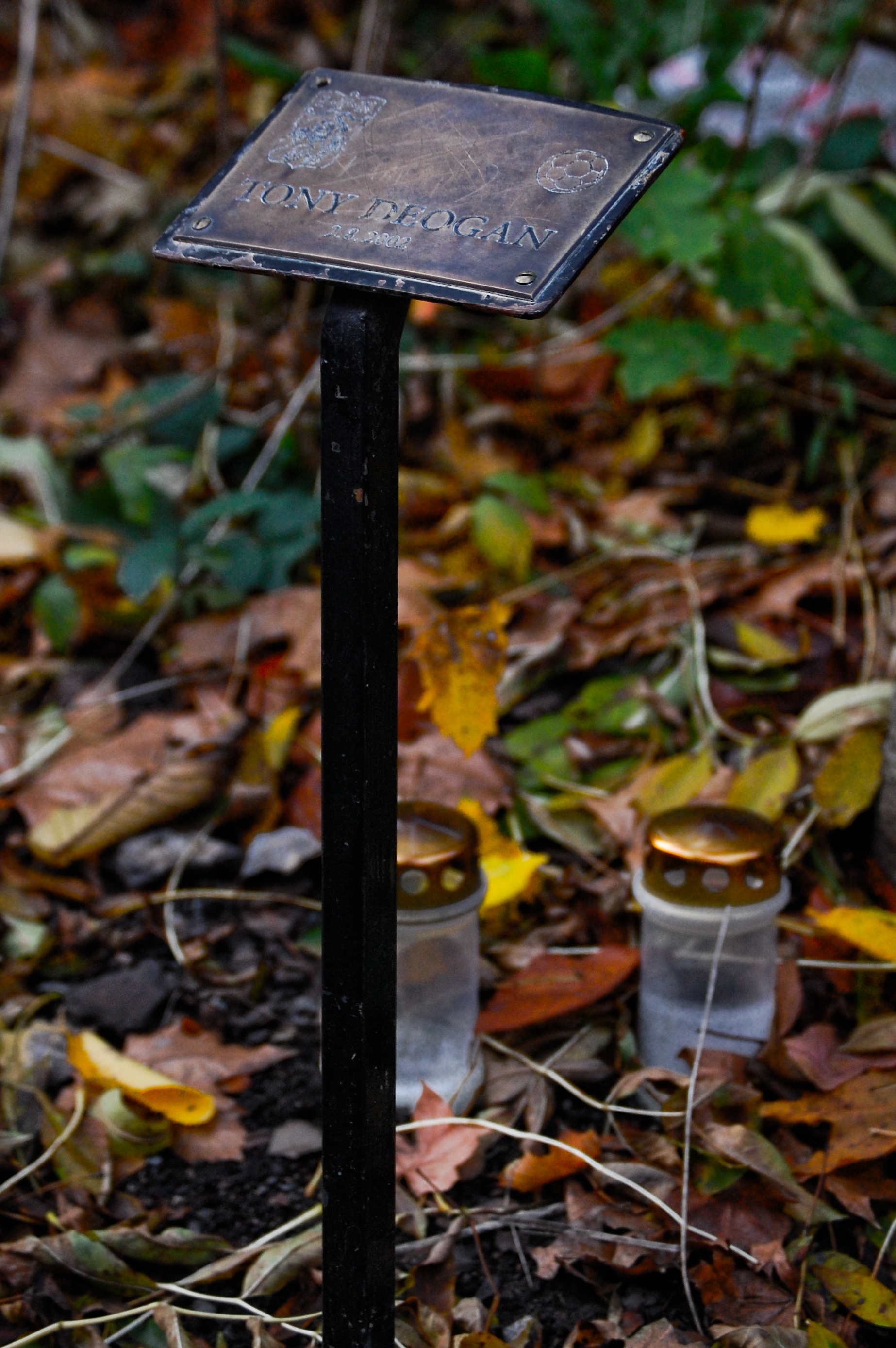
Tony Deogan memory mark in Högalidsparken, 2008.

Tony Deogan (25 November 1975 – 2 August 2002) was a Swedish man killed in Stockholm before a football match, when he suffered a brutal attack at the hands of supporters of another team.

== Beating ==
Deogan became the first Swede to be killed as a result of football hooliganism. He was beaten at Högalidsparken on Södermalm by AIK supporters. Deogan was a supporter of IFK Göteborg, who had played AIK at Råsunda Stadium on 29 July 2002.

A couple of days later he died from injuries he sustained during the brutal beating. Even though the police had several suspects the case never went to trial because of the lack of witnesses. The once high-profile case remains unsolved.

In 2007, all the case documents disappeared and were burned by the responsible attorney.
