= Kenneth Høie =

Norwegian footballer (born 1979)

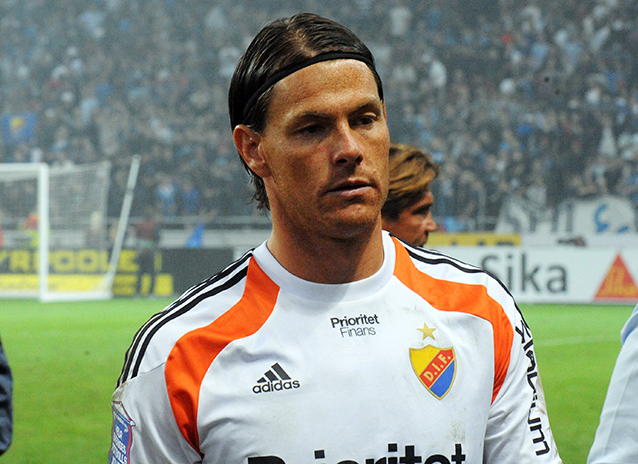
- Høie playing for Djurgårdens IF

Personal information
- Date of birth: 11 September 1979 (age 47)
- Place of birth: Haugesund, Norway
- Height: 1.88 m (6 ft 2 in)
- Position: Goalkeeper

Youth career
- SK Haugar
- FK Haugesund

Senior career*
Years	Team	Apps	(Gls)
1997–2002	FK Haugesund	66	(0)
2002–2004	Bryne FK	21	(0)
2004	→ Sogndal (loan)	7	(0)
2005–2012	IK Start	128	(0)
2006	→ Pors Grenland (loan)	0	(0)
2007	→ Bodø/Glimt (loan)	10	(0)
2012	IF Elfsborg	11	(0)
2012–2016	Djurgårdens IF	117	(0)

International career
1995	Norway U15	6	(0)
1996	Norway U16	2	(0)
1996–1997	Norway U17	8	(0)
1997	Norway U18	4	(0)
1998	Norway U19	1	(0)
1999	Norway U20	1	(0)
1998–2000	Norway U21	6	(0)
2014	Norway	1	(0)
- * Club domestic league appearances and goals

Kenneth Høie (born 11 September 1979) is a Norwegian former professional footballer who played as a goalkeeper. In 1998–99 he had a trial at Manchester United, featuring in one Reserve game, a 0–1 defeat to Liverpool on 22 April.
