= Stefan Karlsson (footballer) =

Swedish footballer

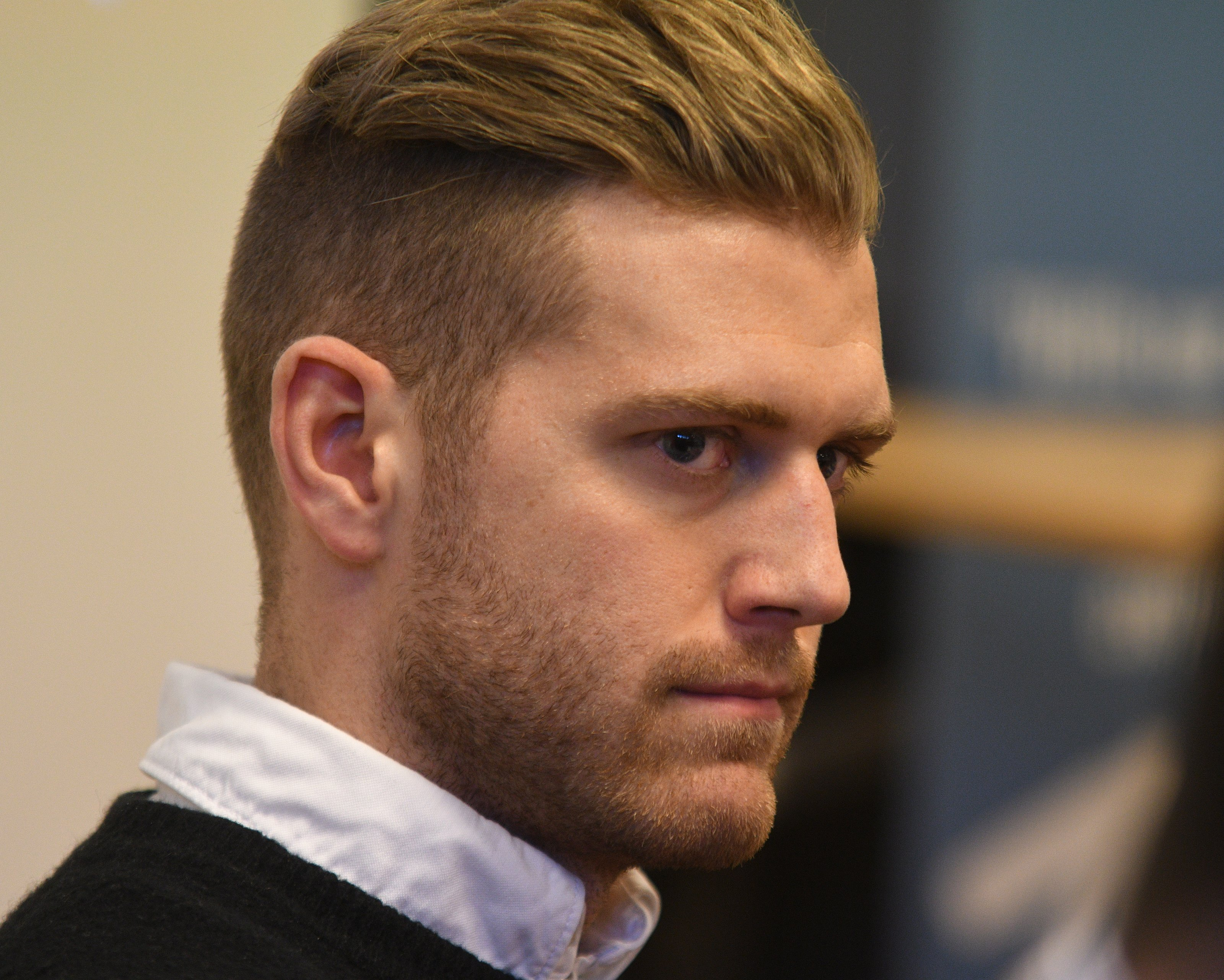

Personal information
- Full name: Stefan Erik Karlsson
- Date of birth: 15 December 1988 (age 37)
- Place of birth: Haninge, Sweden
- Height: 1.76 m (5 ft 9 1/2 in)
- Position: Defender

Youth career
- Växjö Norra IF

Senior career*
Years	Team	Apps	(Gls)
2008–2013	Östers IF	142	(7)
2014–2016	Djurgårdens IF	44	(0)
2016	Östersunds FK	15	(0)
2017	Jönköpings Södra	26	(1)
2018–2020	Östers IF	74	(2)
- * Club domestic league appearances and goals

Stefan Karlsson (born 15 December 1988) is a Swedish former footballer who played as a defender.

== Career ==
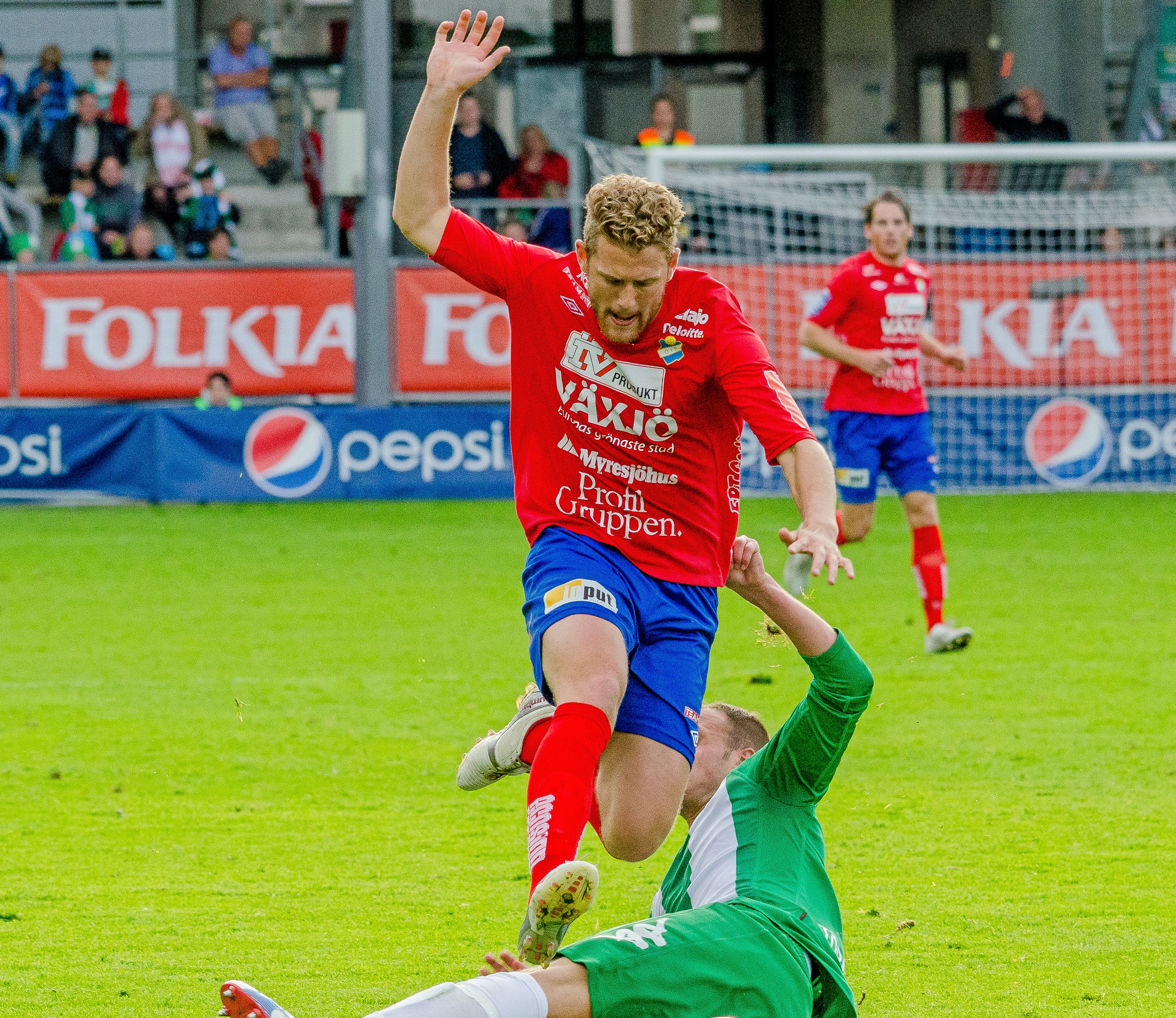
Karlsson playing for Östers IF in the 2012 Superettan.

Karlsson started his career in Växjö Norra. He played with Öster between 2008 and 2013 and was part of taking the team from third-tier Division 1 to top-tier Allsvenskan.

Karlsson joined Djurgården in January 2014.

In July 2016 Karlsson joined Östersunds FK, and played the remaining games that season for them before joining Jönköpings Södra in January 2017.

In January 2018, Karlsson signed a 3-year contract with his old club Östers IF.
