= Mark Mayambela =

South African soccer player

Personal information
- Date of birth: 9 September 1987 (age 39)
- Place of birth: Cape Town, South Africa
- Height: 1.87 m (6 ft 1 1/2 in)
- Position: Left winger

Youth career
- Fast 11
- Mother City
- Trinitarians FC
- Old Mutual Academy

Senior career*
Years	Team	Apps	(Gls)
2007–2010	Bloemfontein Celtic	50	(3)
2010–2013	Orlando Pirates	29	(0)
2013	Mpumalanga Black Aces	0	(0)
2014	Djurgårdens IF	15	(1)
2014–2015	Royal Eagles	4	(0)
2015–2016	Chippa United	10	(2)
2016	SuperSport United	4	(0)
2016–2017	Ajax Cape Town	23	(3)
2017–2019	Chippa United	39	(4)
2019–2020	Cape Town City	5	(0)
2020–	Cape Umoya United	3	(0)
- * Club domestic league appearances and goals as of 16:24, 10 December 2020 (UTC)

Mark Mayambela (born 9 September 1987) is a South African retired professional footballer who is currently a development coach midfielder for Cape Town City F.C.

== Club career ==
=== Bloem Celtic ===
Mayambela began his professional career with Bloemfontein Celtic in 2007 after joining from the Old Mutual Academy. He made his debut for the club against Ajax Cape Town during the 2007–08 Absa Premiership season. During his time at the club he became a fan favourite and earned the nickname "the Professor", ultimately making 50 appearances before joining Orlando Pirates in 2010.

=== Orlando Pirates ===
Mayambela completed a transfer to Orlando Pirates on 27 July 2010, with Bennett Chenene joining Celtic as part of the deal. He struggled in Soweto, though, and by January 2013 had only started two matches in his three years with Pirates. He was linked with a move to Chippa United during the same month but the deal collapsed after he refused to sign a three-year contract, preferring to join on a six-month deal instead.

He made only one substitute appearance during the 2012–13 Premier Soccer League season following which Orlando Pirates elected to release him. During his time at the club, Orlando Pirates lifted two PSL titles, two MTN 8 titles, and one each in the Nedbank Cup and Telkom Cups. Following his release, Mayambela was linked with a move to an unnamed Turkish club and also trained with Moroka Swallows before signing a one-year deal with Mpumalanga Black Aces.

=== Black Aces ===
Mayambela officially joined Mpumalanga Black Aces in August 2013. His time at the club was short-lived, however, as he departed by mutual consent in October after he and teammate Mkhanyiseli Siwahla were alleged to have arrived at training under the influence of alcohol. Both players were asked to undergo alcohol tests at a clinic, but they refused and were suspended pending a disciplinary hearing. Mayambela and Siwahla then failed to attend at the hearing and were subsequently released from their contracts.

Mayambela later denied claims that he was drunk at training and stated that he left Aces because he was unhappy at the club. He failed to play in a single league match for the club and made his only appearance as a substitute in a Telkom Knockout game against former team Orlando Pirates.

=== Djurgårdens IF ===
Following his release from Black Aces, Mayambela trialled with Swedish side Djurgården who elected to sign him on a three-year deal. He made his debut for the club in the Swedish Cup on 9 March 2014 in a 2–0 win over Assyriska and made 15 league appearances in total, scoring once. His contract was terminated by mutual agreement in January 2015 after he had indicated that he wanted to return to South Africa, and he later revealed that his battles with injury and time on the bench had contributed to his decision.

=== Royal Eagles ===
Having once again become a free-agent, Mayambela signed for National First Division side Royal Eagles on a four-month deal in February 2015. He departed at the end of the season having made four appearances.

=== Chippa United ===
Following the expiration of his contract with Royal Eagles, Mayambela returned to the PSL when he signed a season-long deal with Port Elizabeth-based side Chippa United. Just six months into his contract, however, the club agreed to release Mayambela in order to allow him to join SuperSport United, with SuperSport agreeing to buy out the remainder of his contract. He made 10 appearances and scored twice during his time with the club.

=== SuperSport United ===
Mayambela officially joined SuperSport United on 15 January 2016 and signed a three-and-a-half-year contract with the club. Having been signed by Gordon Igesund, he struggled under new club-manager Stuart Baxter and made just four appearances for the club before once again being released. Baxter later stated that Mayambela had fallen short of the club's standards both on and off of the pitch.

=== Ajax Cape Town ===
Following his release from SuperSport United, Mayambela signed as a free-agent for Ajax Cape Town. He spent a solitary season at the club, making 24 appearances across all competitions.

=== Return to Chippa United ===
Mayambela was released by Ajax after one season following which he re-signed for Chippa United in July 2017. He scored his first goals since his return to the club on 4 February 2018, netting his first professional brace in a 3–3 draw with Platinum Stars. The following season, he was named captain of the side.

=== Cape Town City ===
On 1 October 2019, Mayambela signed for Cape Town City on a free transfer, after he was recommended to the club by former coach Benni McCarthy. He scored on his official debut later that day during a 2–1 defeat to AmaZulu. The goal was later registered as an own goal. After finding himself more on the stands than on the pitch, he parted ways with the club at the end of January 2020.

== Honours ==
=== Club ===
Orlando Pirates

- Premier Soccer League: 2010–11; 2011–12
- MTN 8: 2010; 2011
- Telkom Knockout: 2011–12
- Nedbank Cup: 2010–11

== Personal life ==
Mark is the older brother of Mihlali Mayambela who is also a professional footballer currently playing in Cyprus.
