= Simon Lundevall =

Swedish footballer

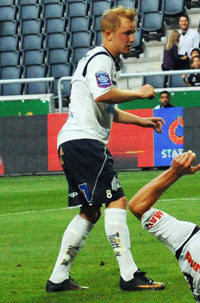
- Lundevall with Gefle in 2013

Personal information
- Date of birth: 23 September 1988 (age 38)
- Place of birth: Eskilstuna, Sweden
- Height: 1.78 m (5 ft 10 in)
- Position: Winger

Team information
- Current team: IFK Eskilstuna

Youth career
- Eskilstuna City

Senior career*
Years	Team	Apps	(Gls)
2005–2008	Eskilstuna City	21	(5)
2009–2011	Västerås SK	54	(8)
2011–2014	Gefle IF	61	(11)
2015–2019	IF Elfsborg	138	(19)
2020	NorthEast United	4	(0)
2020	Volos	0	(0)
2020–2022	Halmstad	29	(0)
2022–	IFK Eskilstuna		

International career
2015	Sweden	1	(0)
- * Club domestic league appearances and goals as of 11 April 2022

Simon Lundevall (born 23 September 1988) is a Swedish footballer who plays as a midfielder for IFK Eskilstuna.

== Club career ==
On 2 October 2020, Lundevall returned to Sweden and signed with Halmstad. In July 2022 he moved down several tiers to IFK Eskilstuna.

== Honours ==
=== Individual ===
- Allsvenskan top assist provider: 2017
