= 2015 IFK Norrköping season =

IFK Norrköping
2015 season
- Chairman: Peter Hunt
- Manager: Jan Andersson
- Stadium: Nya Parken, Norrköping
- Allsvenskan: Champions
- Svenska Cupen: Quarter-finals
- Svenska Supercupen: Winners
- Top goalscorer: League: Emir Kujović (21 goals); All: Emir Kujović (22 goals)
Home colours	Away colours

The 2015 season was IFK Norrköping's 118th in existence, their 75th season in Allsvenskan and 5th consecutive season in the league. The club competed in 2015 Allsvenskan, 2014–15 Svenska Cupen (starting with group stage after qualification previous season) and 2015–16 Svenska Cupen (qualification for next season group stage). The season began with 2014–15 Svenska Cupen group stage on 22 February, with 2015 Allsvenskan starting on 4 April. The league ended with the last match on 31 October 2015, in which they became league champions, and the last match of the season was 2015 Svenska Supercupen on 8 November where IFK Norrköping, as champions, met 2014–15 Svenska Cupen winners, IFK Göteborg.

On 4 October 2015, with three matches remaining in 2015 Allsvenskan, IFK Norrköping secured a top 3 finish and a spot in European competitions for the next season. If they win the league, they will compete in 2016–17 UEFA Champions League and if they finish as runners-up or third-placed team they will compete in 2016–17 UEFA Europa League.

IFK Norrköping won the 2015 Allsvenskan in the last match of the season on 31 October 2015, defeating the champions from the previous season, Malmö FF, with 2–0. By winning 2015 Allsvenskan they qualified for 2016–17 UEFA Champions League.

One week after becoming champions of 2015 Allsvenskan, IFK Norrköping took their second title of the season when they defeated 2014–15 Svenska Cupen winners, IFK Göteborg with 3–0 in 2015 Svenska Supercupen.

== Squad statistics ==
Source: Soccerway and Competitions.

=== Appearances and goals ===
Numbers in parentheses denote appearances as substitute.

No.	Pos.	Nat.	Name	Allsvenskan		2014–15 Svenska Cupen		2015–16 Svenska Cupen		Svenska Supercupen		Total	
No.	Pos.	Nat.	Name	Apps	Goals	Apps	Goals	Apps	Goals	Apps	Goals	Apps	Goals
1	GK	EST	Andreas Vaikla	0	0	0	0	0	0	0	0	0	0
4	DF	SWE	Andreas Johansson	29	2	4	0	1	0	1	0	35	2
5	FW	SWE	Christoffer Nyman	29	10	0	0	1	2	1	1	31	13
6	DF	SWE	Linus Wahlqvist	29	3	3 (1)	0	1	0	1	0	34 (1)	3
7	MF	SWE	Alexander Fransson	29	5	4	0	1	0	1	1	35	6
8	MF	SWE	Rawez Lawan	1 (20)	1	0	0	0 (1)	1	0	0	1 (21)	2
9	MF	ISL	Arnór Ingvi Traustason	29	7	4	2	0	0	1	0	34	9
10	FW	SWE	Emir Kujović	29	21	3	0	0	0	1	1	33	22
11	DF	SWE	Christopher Telo	18 (5)	0	4	0	0	0	0 (1)	0	22 (6)	0
14	MF	SWE	Nicklas Bärkroth	15 (3)	0	4	2	1	0	1	0	21 (3)	2
15	DF	SWE	Marcus Falk-Olander	2 (3)	0	1	0	0	0	0 (1)	0	3 (4)	0
16	FW	SWE	Joel Enarsson	1 (12)	0	1 (2)	0	0 (1)	0	0	0	2 (15)	0
17	FW	SLE	Alhaji Kamara	3 (11)	6	4	3	1	2	0	0	8 (11)	11
20	MF	FIN	Daniel Sjölund	28	2	4	0	1	0	1	0	34	2
21	DF	SWE	Andreas Hadenius	6 (7)	0	0 (3)	0	0	0	0	0	6 (10)	0
23	DF	SWE	David Boo Wiklander	22 (1)	0	0 (1)	0	1	0	1	0	24 (2)	0
24	MF	SWE	Gentrit Citaku	1 (6)	0	0 (3)	1	1	0	0	0	2 (9)	1
25	DF	SWE	Filip Dagerstål	4 (2)	1	3	0	0	0	0 (1)	0	7 (3)	1
26	DF	SWE	Adnan Kojić	0	0	0	0	0	0	0	0	0	0
27	MF	SWE	Tesfaldet Tekie	2 (4)	0	0	0	0 (1)	0	0	0	2 (5)	0
30	DF	CRO	Nikola Tkalčić	23 (4)	2	1	0	1	0	1	0	26 (4)	2
91	GK	MKD	David Mitov Nilsson	30	0	2	0	1	0	1	0	34	0
Players out on loan
19	MF	SWE	Mirza Halvadžić	0 (1)	0	0 (2)	0	0	0	0	0	0 (3)	0
29	GK	SWE	Edvard Setterberg	0	0	0	0	0	0	0	0	0	0
Players that left the club during the season
1	GK	SWE	Marcus Sahlman	0	0	2	0	0	0	0	0	2	0
22	DF	CRC	Christopher Meneses	0	0	0	0	0	0	0	0	0	0

Updated to match played 8 November 2015
Source: Competitions

=== Goalscorers ===
Rank	Position	Name	Allsvenskan	2014–15 Sv. Cup	2015–16 Sv. Cup	Svenska Supercupen	Total
1	FW	(Sweden) Emir Kujović	21	0	0	1	22
2	FW	(Sweden) Christoffer Nyman	10	0	2	1	13
3	FW	(Sierra Leone) Alhaji Kamara	6	3	2	0	11
4	MF	(Iceland) Arnór Ingvi Traustason	7	2	0	0	9
5	MF	(Sweden) Alexander Fransson	5	0	0	1	6
6	DF	(Sweden) Linus Wahlqvist	3	0	0	0	3
7	MF	(Sweden) Nicklas Bärkroth	0	2	0	0	2
7	DF	(Sweden) Andreas Johansson	2	0	0	0	2
7	MF	(Sweden) Rawez Lawan	1	0	1	0	2
7	MF	(Finland) Daniel Sjölund	2	0	0	0	2
7	DF	(Croatia) Nikola Tkalčić	2	0	0	0	2
12	MF	(Sweden) Gentrit Citaku	0	1	0	0	1
12	DF	(Sweden) Filip Dagerstål	1	0	0	0	1
TOTALS			60	8	5	3	76

Updated to match played 8 November 2015
Source: Competitions

=== Disciplinary record ===
Rank	Position	Name	Allsvenskan		2014–15 Sv. Cup		2015–16 Sv. Cup		Svenska Supercupen		Total	
Rank	Position	Name	Yellow card	Red card	Yellow card	Red card	Yellow card	Red card	Yellow card	Red card	Yellow card	Red card
1	MF	(Finland) Daniel Sjölund	9	0	1	0	0	0	0	0	10	0
2	MF	(Iceland) Arnór Ingvi Traustason	2	0	2	0	0	0	1	0	5	0
2	DF	(Sweden) Linus Wahlqvist	4	0	1	0	0	0	0	0	5	0
4	FW	(Sweden) Emir Kujović	4	0	0	0	0	0	0	0	4	0
5	MF	(Sweden) Nicklas Bärkroth	2	0	1	0	0	0	0	0	3	0
5	MF	(Sweden) Gentrit Citaku	2	0	0	0	1	0	0	0	3	0
5	MF	(Sweden) Alexander Fransson	2	0	1	0	0	0	0	0	3	0
5	DF	(Sweden) Andreas Johansson	2	0	1	0	0	0	0	0	3	0
5	FW	(Sierra Leone) Alhaji Kamara	2	0	1	0	0	0	0	0	3	0
10	DF	(Sweden) Andreas Hadenius	2	0	0	0	0	0	0	0	2	0
10	FW	(Sweden) Christoffer Nyman	2	0	0	0	0	0	0	0	2	0
12	DF	(Sweden) David Boo Wiklander	1	0	0	0	0	0	0	0	1	0
12	DF	(Sweden) Filip Dagerstål	1	0	0	0	0	0	0	0	1	0
12	MF	(Sweden) Rawez Lawan	1	0	0	0	0	0	0	0	1	0
12	GK	(Sweden) David Mitov Nilsson	1	0	0	0	0	0	0	0	1	0
12	DF	(Sweden) Christopher Telo	1	0	0	0	0	0	0	0	1	0
Total			38	0	8	0	1	0	1	0	48	0

Updated to match played 8 October 2015
Source: Competitions

== Competitions ==
=== Overall ===
Competition	Started round	Current position / round	Final position / round	First match	Last match
Allsvenskan	—	—	Winners	5 April 2015	31 October 2015
2014–15 Svenska Cupen	Round 2	—	Quarter-finals	11 September 2014	15 March 2015
2015–16 Svenska Cupen	Round 2	Group stage		20 August 2015	
Svenska Supercupen	Final	—	Winners	8 November 2014	

Updated to match played 8 November 2015
Source: Competitions

=== Overview ===
Competition	Record							
Competition	G	W	D	L	GF	GA	GD	Win %
Allsvenskan	30	20	6	4	60	33	+27	66.67
2014–15 Svenska Cupen	4	2	0	2	8	6	+2	50.00
2015–16 Svenska Cupen	1	1	0	0	5	0	+5	100.00
Svenska Supercupen	1	1	0	0	3	0	+3	100.00
Total	36	24	6	6	76	39	+37	66.67

Updated to match played 8 November 2015
Source: Competitions

Note: Only matches during 2015 are included, otherwise they would be counted twice (next season as well).

=== Allsvenskan ===
==== League table ====
Pos	Team	Pld	W	D	L	GF	GA	GD	Pts	Qualification or relegation
1	IFK Norrköping (C)	30	20	6	4	60	33	+27	66	Qualification for the Champions League second qualifying round
2	IFK Göteborg	30	18	9	3	52	22	+30	63	Qualification for the Europa League first qualifying round
3	AIK	30	18	7	5	54	34	+20	61	Qualification for the Europa League first qualifying round
4	IF Elfsborg	30	16	7	7	59	42	+17	55	
5	Malmö FF	30	15	9	6	54	34	+20	54	

Source: svenskfotboll.se (in Swedish)
Rules for classification: 1) Points; 2) Goal difference; 3) Goals scored; 4) Head-to-head points; 5) Head-to-head goal difference; 6) Head-to-head away goals scored; 7) Play-off
(Note: Play-off is only played if need to decide champion, teams for relegation or UEFA competition and will be played on a neutral ground).
(C) Champions

==== Results summary ====
Overall								Home						Away					
Pld	W	D	L	GF	GA	GD	Pts	W	D	L	GF	GA	GD	W	D	L	GF	GA	GD
30	20	6	4	60	33	+27	66	11	2	2	36	20	+16	9	4	2	24	13	+11

Last updated: 31 October 2015.
Source: Svenskfotboll

==== Results by matchday ====
Matchday	1	2	3	4	5	6	7	8	9	10	11	12	13	14	15	16	17	18	19	20	21	22	23	24	25	26	27	28	29	30
Ground	H	A	H	A	H	A	H	A	H	A	H	A	H	H	A	H	A	H	A	A	H	A	A	H	H	A	H	A	H	A
Result	D	W	L	L	W	W	W	D	W	W	W	D	W	W	D	D	W	L	W	D	W	W	W	W	W	W	W	L	W	W
Position	5	3	9	12	8	8	5	5	5	4	3	4	3	2	3	2	2	3	2	4	4	1	1	2	1	1	1	1	1	1

Updated to match(es) played on 31 October 2015. Source: Statto.com
A = Away; H = Home; W = Win; D = Draw; L = Loss

==== Matches ====
On 21 January 2015, the fixtures for the forthcoming season were announced.

Times up to 24 October 2015 (matches 1–28) are CEST (UTC+2), thereafter (matches 29–30) times are CET (UTC+1). This because of the use of Daylight saving time in Sweden.

Win Draw Loss

5 April 2015 1	IFK Norrköping	1–1	Örebro SK	Norrköping
17:30	Nyman 6'	Report	Åhman Persson 62'	Stadium: Nya Parken; Attendance: 8,220; Referee: Stefan Johannesson

9 April 2015 2	Halmstads BK	0–3	IFK Norrköping	Halmstad
19:00		Report	Dagerstål 44'; Kujović 62', 75' (pen.)	Stadium: Örjans Vall; Attendance: 4,308; Referee: Bojan Pandžić

13 April 2015 3	IFK Norrköping	0–4	IF Elfsborg	Norrköping
19:00		Report	Hedlund 18'; Claesson 30'; Rohdén 54'; Zeneli 90+3'	Stadium: Nya Parken; Attendance: 5,665; Referee: Andreas Ekberg

20 April 2015 4	Helsingborgs IF	3–1	IFK Norrköping	Helsingborg
19:00	Atakora 39', 52'; Simović 46'	Report	Kujović 89'	Stadium: Olympia; Attendance: 6,848; Referee: Bojan Pandžić

27 April 2015 5	IFK Norrköping	4–1	Gefle IF	Norrköping
19:00	Nyman 6', 45+1'; Traustason 13', 40'	Report	Oremo 60'	Stadium: Nya Parken; Attendance: 5,317; Referee: Kaspar Sjöberg

30 April 2015 6	BK Häcken	0–2	IFK Norrköping	Gothenburg
17:00		Report	Kujović 34'; Lawan 90+1'	Stadium: Gamla Ullevi; Attendance: 1,826; Referee: Martin Strömbergsson

3 May 2015 7	IFK Norrköping	2–1	Åtvidabergs FF	Norrköping
15:00	Traustason 55'; Nyman 74'	Report	Sköld 61'	Stadium: Nya Parken; Attendance: 9,654; Referee: Michael Lerjéus

10 May 2015 8	AIK	2–2	IFK Norrköping	Solna
17:30	Goitom 34'; Väisänen 37'	Report	Fransson 33'; Kujović 49'	Stadium: Friends Arena; Attendance: 13,123; Referee: Stefan Johannesson

20 May 2015 9	IFK Norrköping	1–0	Hammarby IF	Norrköping
19:00	Kujović 45+1'	Report		Stadium: Nya Parken; Attendance: 13,814; Referee: Michael Lerjéus

25 May 2015 10	GIF Sundsvall	0–1	IFK Norrköping	Sundsvall
19:00		Report	Kujović 15'	Stadium: Norrporten Arena; Attendance: 4,232; Referee: Markus Strömbergsson

30 May 2015 11	IFK Norrköping	2–1	Kalmar FF	Norrköping
16:00	Kujović 2'; Nyman 65'	Report	Antonsson 78'	Stadium: Nya Parken; Attendance: 5,690; Referee: Johan Hamlin

4 June 2015 12	Djurgårdens IF	1–1	IFK Norrköping	Stockholm
19:00	Johnson 36'	Report	Tkalčić 55'	Stadium: Tele2 Arena; Attendance: 17,902; Referee: Mohammed Al-Hakim

7 June 2015 13	IFK Norrköping	2–0	Falkenbergs FF	Norrköping
17:30	Tkalčić 20'; Kujović 35'	Report		Stadium: Nya Parken; Attendance: 6,688; Referee: Glenn Nyberg

4 July 2015 14	IFK Norrköping	3–1	Malmö FF	Norrköping
18:00	Wahlqvist 13'; Kujović 45+3' (pen.); Fransson 88'	Report	Kroon 9'	Stadium: Nya Parken; Attendance: 12,379; Referee: Markus Strömbergsson

12 July 2015 15	IFK Göteborg	0–0	IFK Norrköping	Gothenburg
17:30		Report		Stadium: Gamla Ullevi; Attendance: 16,728; Referee: Johan Hamlin

19 July 2015 16	IFK Norrköping	2–2	IFK Göteborg	Norrköping
15:00	Kujović 27'; Fransson 79'	Report	Svensson 18'; Rieks 68'	Stadium: Nya Parken; Attendance: 14,369; Referee: Mohammed Al-Hakim

27 July 2015 17	Hammarby IF	0–1	IFK Norrköping	Stockholm
19:00		Report	Kujović 37'	Stadium: Tele2 Arena; Attendance: 27,011; Referee: Glenn Nyberg

2 August 2015 18	IFK Norrköping	1–2	AIK	Norrköping
15:00	Wahlqvist 68'	Report	Bangura 23'; Goitom 59'	Stadium: Nya Parken; Attendance: 14,711; Referee: Mohammed Al-Hakim

9 August 2015 19	Örebro SK	1–3	IFK Norrköping	Örebro
15:00	Broberg 61'	Report	Traustason 20'; Nyman 39'; Kujović 62'	Stadium: Behrn Arena; Attendance: 7,405; Referee: Kristoffer Karlsson

17 August 2015 20	Åtvidabergs FF	1–1	IFK Norrköping	Åtvidaberg
19:05	Dahlén 32'	Report	Kamara 90+3'	Stadium: Kopparvallen; Attendance: 7,112; Referee: Martin Strömbergsson

24 August 2015 21	IFK Norrköping	3–2	Helsingborgs IF	Norrköping
19:00	Traustason 24'; Sjölund 81'; Johansson 90+5'	Report	Bojanić 57'; Simović 78'	Stadium: Nya Parken; Attendance: 9,841; Referee: Bojan Pandžić

29 August 2015 22	Falkenbergs FF	0–1	IFK Norrköping	Falkenberg
16:00		Report	Nyman 52'	Stadium: Falkenbergs IP; Attendance: 3,610; Referee: Kristoffer Karlsson

11 September 2015 23	Kalmar FF	1–2	IFK Norrköping	Kalmar
19:00	Antonsson 68' (pen.)	Report	Kujović 43'; Fransson 45'	Stadium: Guldfågeln Arena; Attendance: 5,109; Referee: Martin Strömbergsson

20 September 2015 24	IFK Norrköping	5–1	GIF Sundsvall	Norrköping
17:30	Nyman 38', 53'; Kujović 59'; Johansson 61'; Fransson 66'	Report	Dibba 90'	Stadium: Nya Parken; Attendance: 9,023; Referee: Andreas Ekberg

23 September 2015 25	IFK Norrköping	4–2	Djurgårdens IF	Norrköping
19:00	Traustason 21'; Sjölund 55'; Wahlqvist 69'; Kujović 90'	Report	Andersson 58'; Arvidsson 68' (pen.)	Stadium: Nya Parken; Attendance: 12,322; Referee: Bojan Pandžić

27 September 2015 26	Gefle IF	1–2	IFK Norrköping	Gävle
17:30	Lantto 21'	Report	Nyman 12'; Kujović 81'	Stadium: Gavlevallen; Attendance: 3,470; Referee: Kristoffer Karlsson

4 October 2015 27	IFK Norrköping	3–1	BK Häcken	Norrköping
17:30	Kujović 51' (pen.), 54'; Kamara 73'	Report	Paulinho 66'	Stadium: Nya Parken; Attendance: 10,625; Referee: Jonas Eriksson

19 October 2015 28	IF Elfsborg	3–2	IFK Norrköping	Borås
19:00	Zeneli 16'; Claesson 21', 37'	Report	Kamara 12', 77'	Stadium: Borås Arena; Attendance: 8,810; Referee: Markus Strömbergsson

25 October 2015 29	IFK Norrköping	3–1	Halmstads BK	Norrköping
17:30	Kamara 20', 67'; Kujović 34'	Report	Barny 74'	Stadium: Nya Parken; Attendance: 16,125; Referee: Glenn Nyberg

31 October 2015 30	Malmö FF	0–2	IFK Norrköping	Malmö
13:00		Report	Kujović 34'; Traustason 90+3'	Stadium: Swedbank Stadion; Attendance: 20,520; Referee: Jonas Eriksson

==== Score overview ====
Win Draw Loss

Opposition	Home score	Away score	Double
AIK	1–2	2–2	No
BK Häcken	3–1	2–0	Yes
Djurgårdens IF	4–2	1–1	No
Falkenbergs FF	2–0	1–0	Yes
Gefle IF	4–1	2–1	Yes
GIF Sundsvall	5–1	1–0	Yes
Hammarby IF	1–0	1–0	Yes
Halmstads BK	3–1	3–0	Yes
Helsingborgs IF	3–2	1–3	No
IF Elfsborg	0–4	2–3	No
IFK Göteborg	2–2	0–0	No
Kalmar FF	2–1	2–1	Yes
Malmö FF	3–1	2–0	Yes
Åtvidabergs FF	2–1	1–1	No
Örebro SK	1–1	3–1	No

Note: IFK Norrköping goals is listed first.

=== Svenska Cupen ===
Svenska Cupen, unlike Allsvenskan, spans over two seasons, with qualification in the fall and group stage and final stages in the spring. Therefore, IFK Norrköping will compete in both 2014–15 Svenska Cupen (group stage and final stages) and 2015–16 Svenska Cupen (qualification for next year group stage and final stages) for the 2015 season.

==== 2014–15 Svenska Cupen ====
2014–15 Svenska Cupen were played during the fall in 2014 and in the spring of 2015, with the first two rounds in 2014 and the group stage and final stages in the beginning of 2015.

===== Group stage =====
IFK Norrköping were drawn in a group with Djurgårdens IF (first tier), Ängelholms FF (second tier) and Norrby IF (third tier) with the winner of the group advancing to the final stages (quarter-finals). IFK Norrköping won their first two matches against Norrby IF and Ängelholms FF, which was enough to win the group (on goal differential) despite losing to Djurgårdens IF in the last match. This meant IFK Norrköping advanced to the final stages.

Pos	Team	Pld	W	D	L	GF	GA	GD	Pts	Qualification	IFKN	NIF	DIF	ÄFF
1	IFK Norrköping	3	2	0	1	7	3	+4	6	Advance to Knockout stage	—	—	—	2–0
2	Norrby IF	3	2	0	1	9	6	+3	6		0–4	—	4–2	—
3	Djurgårdens IF	3	1	1	1	5	5	0	4		3–1	—	—	0–0
4	Ängelholms FF	3	0	1	2	0	7	−7	1		—	0–5	—	—

Source: svenskfotboll.se (in Swedish)
Rules for classification: 1) Points; 2) Goal difference; 3) Number of goals scored; 4) Head-to-head record; 5) Highest ranked team

Times are CET (UTC+1).

Win Draw Loss

22 February 2015 Matchday 1	Norrby IF	0–4	IFK Norrköping	Borås
16:00		Report	Bärkroth 24'; Kamara 45', 63'; Citaku 84'	Stadium: Borås Arena; Attendance: 403; Referee: Antti Kanerva

1 March 2015 Matchday 2	IFK Norrköping	2–0	Ängelholms FF	Norrköping
19:00	Kamara 3'; Bärkroth 84'	Report		Stadium: Nya Parken; Referee: Antti Kanerva

5 March 2015 Matchday 3	Djurgårdens IF	3–1	IFK Norrköping	Stockholm
19:00	Karlström 6'; Berntsen 15'; Radetinac 27'	Report	Traustason 82'	Stadium: Tele2 Arena; Referee: Bojan Pandžić

===== Knockout stage =====
IFK Norrköping qualified for the knockout stage as group stage winners, but they were unseeded in the quarter-final draw because they were not one of the four teams with the best record in the group stage. All of the winners in the group stage were teams that would be participating in 2015 Allsvenskan, so IFK Norrköping was drawn against BK Häcken in a draw with many tough opponents (especially since being unseeded). BK Häcken had the advantage of playing at home since they were the seeded team and, despite scoring the first goal, IFK Norrköping was not able to defeat BK Häcken away from home and lost with the final score 3–1. It was Gunnar Heiðar Þorvaldsson, who previously played for IFK Norrköping, that scored a brace for BK Häcken to turn the match around, and Simon Gustafson ended the scoring with the 3–1 goal.

15 March 2015 Quarter-final	BK Häcken	3–1	IFK Norrköping	Gamla Ullevi
16:00	Þorvaldsson 36', 46'; Si. Gustafson 57'	Report	Traustason 27'	Stadium: Gamla Ullevi; Attendance: 729; Referee: Kristoffer Karlsson

==== 2015–16 Svenska Cupen ====
2015–16 Svenska Cupen will be played during the fall in 2015 and in the spring of 2016, with the first two rounds in 2015 and the group stage and final stages in the beginning of 2016.

===== Round 2 =====
IFK Norrköping entered Svenska Cupen in the second round (all teams from top tier Allsvenskan and second tier Superettan receive bye to this round). They were seeded in the draw together with all the other teams from Allsvenskan and Superettan, and they were drawn against Akropolis IF from Division 1 (fourth tier). The match was played on 20 August 2015 and it ended as a 5–0 win for IFK Norrköping, who qualified for the group stage to be played in the beginning of the next season.

Times are CET (UTC+1).

Win Draw Loss

20 August 2015 Round 2	Akropolis IF	0–5	IFK Norrköping	Stockholm
19:00		Report	Nyman 15', 69'; Kamara 20', 24'; Lawan 85'	Stadium: Spånga IP; Attendance: 320; Referee: Diako Behnam

=== Svenska Supercupen ===
Svenska Supercupen, is a cup being played between league champions and cup winners, with the league winners being the home team. The 2015 Svenska Supercupen was played between 2015 Allsvenskan champions, IFK Norrköping, and 2014–15 Svenska Cupen winners, IFK Göteborg (runners-up in Allsvenskan), at Nya Parken, Norrköping on 8 November 2015. IFK Norrköping defeated IFK Göteborg with 3–0 and won their second title of the season.

Times are CET (UTC+1).

Win Draw Loss

8 November 2015 Final	IFK Norrköping	3–0	IFK Göteborg	Norrköping
19:30	Fransson 3'; Nyman 15'; Kujović 43'	Report		Stadium: Nya Parken; Attendance: 2,662; Referee: Johan Hamlin
