= 2016 IFK Norrköping season =

IFK Norrköping
2016 season
- Chairman: Peter Hunt
- Manager: Jan Andersson (until 29 May 2016); Jens Gustafsson (from 1 June 2016)
- Stadium: Nya Parken, Norrköping
- Allsvenskan: 2nd
- Svenska Cupen: Quarter-finals
- Champions League: Second qualifying round
- Top goalscorer: League: Sebastian Andersson (12); All: Sebastian Andersson (15)
| Home colours | Away colours |
- All statistics correct as of 24 October 2016.

The 2016 season is IFK Norrköping's 119th in existence, their 76th season in Allsvenskan and 6th consecutive season in the league. The club compete in 2016 Allsvenskan, 2015–16 Svenska Cupen (group stage and onwards), 2016–17 Svenska Cupen (qualifying rounds) and 2016–17 UEFA Champions League (entering in the second qualifying round as winners of 2015 Allsvenskan). IFK drew an average home league attendance of 10,449.

The season began on 20 February 2016 with the 2015–16 Svenska Cupen group stage, and the league began on 2 April 2016 and ended in November 2016.

IFK Norrköping are the defending league champions after they won the 2015 Allsvenskan in the last match of the season. In that last match they defeated the champions from the previous season, Malmö FF, with 2–0 and enjoyed their first league title for 26 years (13 titles in total).

== Squad statistics ==
Source: Soccerway and Competitions.

=== Appearances and goals ===
As of 24 October 2016

Numbers in parentheses denote appearances as substitute.

| No. | Pos. | Nat. | Name | Allsvenskan | | 2015–16 Sv. Cup | | 2016–17 Sv. Cup | | Champions League | | Total | |
| No. | Pos. | Nat. | Name | Apps | Goals | Apps | Goals | Apps | Goals | Apps | Goals | Apps | Goals |
|---|---|---|---|---|---|---|---|---|---|---|---|---|---|
| 1 | GK | EST | Andreas Vaikla | 12 (1) | 0 | 4 | 0 | 1 | 0 | 2 | 0 | 19 (1) | 0 |
| 2 | DF | SWE | Henrik Castegren | 0 (3) | 0 | 0 | 0 | 0 (1) | 1 | 0 | 0 | 0 (4) | 1 |
| 3 | DF | ISL | Jón Guðni Fjóluson | 14 (1) | 1 | 4 | 0 | 0 | 0 | 2 | 0 | 20 (1) | 1 |
| 4 | DF | SWE | Andreas Johansson | 27 | 1 | 4 | 0 | 1 | 0 | 2 | 0 | 34 | 1 |
| 6 | DF | SWE | Linus Wahlqvist | 25 | 2 | 4 | 0 | 1 | 0 | 2 | 0 | 32 | 2 |
| 7 | MF | SWE | Andreas Blomqvist | 15 (3) | 3 | 1 (1) | 0 | 0 | 0 | 2 | 0 | 18 (4) | 3 |
| 8 | MF | SWE | Nicklas Bärkroth | 14 (5) | 2 | 4 | 1 | 0 (1) | 0 | 2 | 0 | 20 (6) | 3 |
| 9 | MF | SWE | David Moberg Karlsson | 9 (5) | 2 | 0 | 0 | 1 | 0 | 0 | 0 | 10 (5) | 2 |
| 11 | DF | SWE | Christopher Telo | 21 (3) | 1 | 2 (2) | 0 | 0 | 0 | 2 | 0 | 25 (5) | 1 |
| 14 | MF | SWE | Eric Smith | 2 (5) | 0 | 1 | 0 | 1 | 0 | 1 (1) | 0 | 5 (6) | 0 |
| 15 | MF | SWE | Marcus Falk-Olander | 9 (2) | 0 | 0 | 0 | 0 | 0 | 0 | 0 | 9 (2) | 0 |
| 17 | FW | SWE | Karl Holmberg | 5 (4) | 3 | 0 | 0 | 1 | 1 | 0 | 0 | 6 (4) | 4 |
| 19 | FW | SWE | Sebastian Andersson | 19 (8) | 12 | 0 | 0 | 1 | 0 | 2 | 3 | 22 (8) | 15 |
| 20 | MF | FIN | Daniel Sjölund | 24 | 2 | 4 | 0 | 1 | 0 | 2 | 0 | 31 | 2 |
| 21 | DF | SWE | Andreas Hadenius | 3 (15) | 1 | 0 (3) | 0 | 1 | 0 | 0 (2) | 0 | 4 (20) | 1 |
| 23 | MF | SWE | Niclas Eliasson | 6 (4) | 1 | 0 | 0 | 1 | 2 | 0 | 0 | 7 (4) | 3 |
| 24 | MF | SWE | Gentrit Citaku | 0 (1) | 0 | 0 (2) | 0 | 0 | 0 | 0 (1) | 0 | 0 (4) | 0 |
| 25 | DF | SWE | Filip Dagerstål | 13 (1) | 0 | 0 | 0 | 1 | 0 | 0 (1) | 0 | 14 (2) | 0 |
| 26 | MF | SWE | Adin Bukva | 0 (3) | 0 | 0 | 0 | 0 (1) | 0 | 0 | 0 | 0 (4) | 0 |
| 27 | MF | SWE | Tesfaldet Tekie | 17 (6) | 0 | 3 (1) | 0 | 0 | 0 | 1 (1) | 0 | 21 (8) | 0 |
| 30 | MF | CRO | Nikola Tkalčić | 10 | 3 | 2 | 0 | 0 | 0 | 0 | 0 | 12 | 3 |
| 31 | GK | AUT | Michael Langer | 10 | 0 | 0 | 0 | 0 | 0 | 0 | 0 | 10 | 0 |
| 91 | GK | MKD | David Mitov Nilsson | 5 | 0 | 0 | 0 | 0 | 0 | 0 | 0 | 5 | 0 |
Players that left the club during the season
| 5 | FW | SWE | Christoffer Nyman | 19 | 9 | 4 | 0 | 0 | 0 | 2 | 1 | 25 | 10 |
| 9 | MF | ISL | Arnór Ingvi Traustason | 9 | 2 | 3 | 1 | 0 | 0 | 0 | 0 | 12 | 3 |
| 10 | FW | SWE | Emir Kujović | 9 | 7 | 4 | 3 | 0 | 0 | 0 | 0 | 13 | 10 |
| 16 | FW | SWE | Joel Enarsson | 0 (2) | 0 | 0 (3) | 1 | 0 | 0 | 0 | 0 | 0 (5) | 1 |

=== Goalscorers ===
As of 24 October 2016

| Rank | Position | Name | Allsvenskan | 2015–16 Sv. Cup | 2016–17 Sv. Cup | Champions League | Total |
|---|---|---|---|---|---|---|---|
| 1 | FW | (Sweden) Sebastian Andersson | 12 | 0 | 0 | 3 | 15 |
| 2 | FW | (Sweden) Emir Kujović | 7 | 3 | 0 | 0 | 10 |
| 2 | FW | (Sweden) Christoffer Nyman | 9 | 0 | 0 | 1 | 10 |
| 4 | FW | (Sweden) Karl Holmberg | 3 | 0 | 1 | 0 | 4 |
| 5 | MF | (Sweden) Andreas Blomqvist | 3 | 0 | 0 | 0 | 3 |
| 5 | MF | (Sweden) Nicklas Bärkroth | 2 | 1 | 0 | 0 | 3 |
| 5 | MF | (Sweden) Niclas Eliasson | 1 | 0 | 2 | 0 | 3 |
| 5 | MF | (Croatia) Nikola Tkalčić | 3 | 0 | 0 | 0 | 3 |
| 5 | MF | (Iceland) Arnór Ingvi Traustason | 2 | 1 | 0 | 0 | 3 |
| 10 | MF | (Sweden) David Moberg Karlsson | 2 | 0 | 0 | 0 | 2 |
| 10 | MF | (Finland) Daniel Sjölund | 2 | 0 | 0 | 0 | 2 |
| 10 | DF | (Sweden) Linus Wahlqvist | 2 | 0 | 0 | 0 | 2 |
| 13 | DF | (Sweden) Henrik Castegren | 0 | 0 | 1 | 0 | 1 |
| 13 | FW | (Sweden) Joel Enarsson | 0 | 1 | 0 | 0 | 1 |
| 13 | DF | (Iceland) Jón Guðni Fjóluson | 1 | 0 | 0 | 0 | 1 |
| 13 | DF | (Sweden) Andreas Hadenius | 1 | 0 | 0 | 0 | 1 |
| 13 | DF | (Sweden) Andreas Johansson | 1 | 0 | 0 | 0 | 1 |
| 13 | DF | (Sweden) Christopher Telo | 1 | 0 | 0 | 0 | 1 |
| Own goals | | | 2 | 0 | 0 | 0 | 2 |
| Total | | | 54 | 6 | 4 | 4 | 68 |

=== Disciplinary record ===
As of 24 October 2016

| Rank | Position | Name | Allsvenskan | | 2015–16 Sv. Cup | | 2016–17 Sv. Cup | | Champions League | | Total | |
| Rank | Position | Name | Yellow card | Red card | Yellow card | Red card | Yellow card | Red card | Yellow card | Red card | Yellow card | Red card |
|---|---|---|---|---|---|---|---|---|---|---|---|---|
| 1 | MF | (Finland) Daniel Sjölund | 6 | 0 | 0 | 0 | 0 | 0 | 0 | 0 | 6 | 0 |
| 2 | MF | (Sweden) Andreas Blomqvist | 3 | 0 | 1 | 0 | 0 | 0 | 1 | 0 | 5 | 0 |
| 3 | MF | (Sweden) Nicklas Bärkroth | 3 | 0 | 1 | 0 | 0 | 0 | 0 | 0 | 4 | 0 |
| 3 | DF | (Sweden) Christopher Telo | 1 | 0 | 2 | 0 | 0 | 0 | 1 | 0 | 4 | 0 |
| 3 | MF | (Iceland) Arnór Ingvi Traustason | 3 | 0 | 1 | 0 | 0 | 0 | 0 | 0 | 4 | 0 |
| 6 | DF | (Sweden) Marcus Falk-Olander | 3 | 0 | 0 | 0 | 0 | 0 | 0 | 0 | 3 | 0 |
| 6 | DF | (Iceland) Jón Guðni Fjóluson | 2 | 0 | 0 | 0 | 0 | 0 | 1 | 0 | 3 | 0 |
| 6 | DF | (Sweden) Andreas Johansson | 1 | 0 | 2 | 0 | 0 | 0 | 0 | 0 | 3 | 0 |
| 9 | FW | (Sweden) Sebastian Andersson | 1 | 0 | 0 | 0 | 0 | 0 | 1 | 0 | 2 | 0 |
| 9 | DF | (Sweden) Andreas Hadenius | 2 | 0 | 0 | 0 | 0 | 0 | 0 | 0 | 2 | 0 |
| 9 | FW | (Sweden) Christoffer Nyman | 2 | 0 | 0 | 0 | 0 | 0 | 0 | 0 | 2 | 0 |
| 9 | DF | (Sweden) Linus Wahlqvist | 2 | 0 | 0 | 0 | 0 | 0 | 0 | 0 | 2 | 0 |
| 13 | MF | (Sweden) Gentrit Citaku | 0 | 0 | 1 | 0 | 0 | 0 | 0 | 0 | 1 | 0 |
| 13 | FW | (Sweden) Emir Kujović | 1 | 0 | 0 | 0 | 0 | 0 | 0 | 0 | 1 | 0 |
| 13 | DF | (Croatia) Nikola Tkalčić | 1 | 0 | 0 | 0 | 0 | 0 | 0 | 0 | 1 | 0 |
| 13 | GK | (Estonia) Andreas Vaikla | 1 | 0 | 0 | 0 | 0 | 0 | 0 | 0 | 1 | 0 |
| Total | | | 32 | 0 | 8 | 0 | 0 | 0 | 4 | 0 | 44 | 0 |

== Competitions ==
=== Overall ===
| Competition | Started round | Current position / round | Final position / round | First match | Last match |
|---|---|---|---|---|---|
| Allsvenskan | — | 2nd | | 2 April 2016 | 6 November 2016 |
| 2015–16 Svenska Cupen | Round 2 | — | Quarter-finals | 20 August 2015 | 13 March 2016 |
| 2016–17 Svenska Cupen | Round 2 | Group stage | | 24 August 2016 | |
| UEFA Champions League | Second qualifying round | — | Second qualifying round | 13 July 2016 | 20 July 2016 |

Updated to match played 24 October 2016
Source: Competitions

=== Overview ===
| Competition | Record | | | | | | | |
| Competition | G | W | D | L | GF | GA | GD | Win % |
|---|---|---|---|---|---|---|---|---|
| Allsvenskan | 27 | 17 | 5 | 5 | 54 | 33 | +21 | 62.96 |
| 2015–16 Svenska Cupen | 4 | 2 | 1 | 1 | 6 | 2 | +4 | 50.00 |
| 2016–17 Svenska Cupen | 1 | 1 | 0 | 0 | 4 | 0 | +4 | 100.00 |
| UEFA Champions League | 2 | 1 | 0 | 1 | 4 | 5 | −1 | 50.00 |
| Total | 34 | 21 | 6 | 7 | 68 | 40 | +28 | 61.76 |

Updated to match played 24 October 2016
Source: Competitions

Note: Only matches during 2016 are included, otherwise they would be counted twice (previous season or next season as well).

=== Allsvenskan ===
==== League table ====
| Pos | Team | Pld | W | D | L | GF | GA | GD | Pts | Qualification or relegation |
|---|---|---|---|---|---|---|---|---|---|---|
| 1 | Malmö FF (C) | 30 | 21 | 3 | 6 | 60 | 26 | +34 | 66 | Qualification for the Champions League second qualifying round |
| 2 | AIK | 30 | 17 | 9 | 4 | 52 | 26 | +26 | 60 | Qualification for the Europa League first qualifying round |
| 3 | IFK Norrköping | 30 | 18 | 6 | 6 | 59 | 37 | +22 | 60 | Qualification for the Europa League first qualifying round |
| 4 | IFK Göteborg | 30 | 14 | 8 | 8 | 56 | 47 | +9 | 50 | |
| 5 | IF Elfsborg | 30 | 13 | 9 | 8 | 58 | 38 | +20 | 48 | |

Source: svenskfotboll.se (in Swedish)
Rules for classification: 1) Points; 2) Goal difference; 3) Goals scored; 4) Head-to-head points; 5) Head-to-head goal difference; 6) Head-to-head away goals scored; 7) Play-off
(Note: Play-off is only played if need to decide champion, teams for relegation or UEFA competition and will be played on a neutral ground).
(C) Champions

==== Results summary ====
| Overall | | | | | | | | Home | | | | | | Away | | | | | |
| Pld | W | D | L | GF | GA | GD | Pts | W | D | L | GF | GA | GD | W | D | L | GF | GA | GD |
|---|---|---|---|---|---|---|---|---|---|---|---|---|---|---|---|---|---|---|---|
| 27 | 17 | 5 | 5 | 54 | 33 | +21 | 56 | 10 | 2 | 2 | 37 | 16 | +21 | 7 | 3 | 3 | 17 | 17 | 0 |

Last updated: 24 October 2016.
Source: Svenskfotboll

==== Results by matchday ====
| Matchday | 1 | 2 | 3 | 4 | 5 | 6 | 7 | 8 | 9 | 10 | 11 | 12 | 13 | 14 | 15 | 16 | 17 | 18 | 19 | 20 | 21 | 22 | 23 | 24 | 25 | 26 | 27 | 28 | 29 | 30 |
|---|---|---|---|---|---|---|---|---|---|---|---|---|---|---|---|---|---|---|---|---|---|---|---|---|---|---|---|---|---|---|
| Ground | A | H | A | H | A | H | H | A | H | A | A | H | A | H | H | A | H | H | A | A | H | H | A | H | A | H | H | | | |
| Result | L | W | W | W | L | W | W | W | W | D | D | D | W | D | W | W | W | W | D | W | W | W | W | L | L | L | W | | | |
| Position | 16 | 4 | 3 | 2 | 2 | 1 | 1 | 1 | 1 | 1 | 1 | 2 | 2 | 2 | 2 | 1 | 2 | 1 | 1 | 1 | 1 | 1 | 1 | 2 | 2 | 3 | 2 | | | |

Updated to match(es) played on 24 October 2016. Source: Statto.com
A = Away; H = Home; W = Win; D = Draw; L = Loss

==== Matches ====
On 9 December 2015, the fixtures for the forthcoming season were announced. On 19 December 2015, the dates and kickoff times for the first twelve rounds were announced. The dates for matches in round 13 to 20 were announced on 16 May 2016, and on 1 June 2016 the rest of the rounds (21 to 30) were announced, with the exception of the second-to-last round (29th round) which was decided on a later date.

Kickoff times before 24 October 2016 are CEST (UTC+2), otherwise times are CET (UTC+1). This because of the use of Daylight saving time in Sweden.

Win Draw Loss

| 2 April 2016 1 | Malmö FF | 3–1 | IFK Norrköping | Malmö |
| 13:00 | Christiansen 44'; Berget 76' (pen.); Rakip 90+2' | Report | Nyman 16' | Stadium: Swedbank Stadion; Attendance: 21,085; Referee: Stefan Johannesson |

| 6 April 2016 2 | IFK Norrköping | 4–1 | Kalmar FF | Norrköping |
| 18:30 | Tkalčić 23'; Fjóluson 47'; Kujović 71'; Telo 75' | Report | Antonsson 66' | Stadium: Nya Parken; Attendance: 9,786; Referee: Kaspar Sjöberg |

| 9 April 2016 3 | BK Häcken | 1–2 | IFK Norrköping | Gothenburg |
| 16:00 | A. Andersson 23' | Report | Nyman 60'; Andersson 90+6' | Stadium: Bravida Arena; Attendance: 3,453; Referee: Kristoffer Karlsson |

| 17 April 2016 4 | IFK Norrköping | 4–1 | AIK | Norrköping |
| 15:00 | Nyman 23'; Karlsson 49' (o.g.); Andersson 62'; Tkalčić 90+4' | Report | Strandberg 60' | Stadium: Nya Parken; Attendance: 14,150; Referee: Stefan Johannesson |

| 22 April 2016 5 | Falkenbergs FF | 2–1 | IFK Norrköping | Falkenberg |
| 19:00 | Nilsson 26'; Juel-Nielsen 82' | Report | Hadenius 77' | Stadium: Falkenbergs IP; Attendance: 2,444; Referee: Per Melin |

| 26 April 2016 6 | IFK Norrköping | 3–1 | Hammarby IF | Norrköping |
| 18:30 | Wahlqvist 20'; Blomqvist 54'; Traustason 90+8' (pen.) | Report | Israelsson 42' | Stadium: Nya Parken; Attendance: 15,030; Referee: Kaspar Sjöberg |

| 2 May 2016 7 | IFK Norrköping | 3–0 | Helsingborgs IF | Norrköping |
| 19:00 | Nyman 10'; Kujović 25', 36' (pen.) | Report | | Stadium: Nya Parken; Attendance: 10,411; Referee: Jonas Eriksson |

| 8 May 2016 8 | Jönköpings Södra IF | 0–2 | IFK Norrköping | Jönköping |
| 15:00 | | Report | Nyman 15'; Kujović 63' | Stadium: Stadsparksvallen; Attendance: 6,191; Referee: Kristoffer Karlsson |

| 15 May 2016 9 | IFK Norrköping | 3–1 | GIF Sundsvall | Norrköping |
| 15:00 | Kujović 18' (pen.); Andersson 53'; Tkalčić 90+4' | Report | Eklund 89' | Stadium: Nya Parken; Attendance: 9,228; Referee: Glenn Nyberg |

| 19 May 2016 10 | IFK Göteborg | 1–1 | IFK Norrköping | Gothenburg |
| 19:00 | Salomonsson 87' | Report | Traustason 49' | Stadium: Gamla Ullevi; Attendance: 15,024; Referee: Martin Strömbergsson |

| 22 May 2016 11 | Örebro SK | 2–2 | IFK Norrköping | Örebro |
| 15:00 | Sema 18'; Gustavsson 75' | Report | Kujović 24', 42' | Stadium: Behrn Arena; Attendance: 11,407; Referee: Kaspar Sjöberg |

| 29 May 2016 12 | IFK Norrköping | 0–0 | IF Elfsborg | Norrköping |
| 17:30 | | Report | | Stadium: Nya Parken; Attendance: 14,571; Referee: Mohammed Al-Hakim |

| 9 July 2016 13 | Djurgårdens IF | 0–1 | IFK Norrköping | Stockholm |
| 16:00 | | Report | Andersson 67' | Stadium: Tele2 Arena; Attendance: 13,598; Referee: Martin Strömbergsson |

| 16 July 2016 14 | IFK Norrköping | 3–3 | Östersunds FK | Norrköping |
| 16:00 | Bärkroth 13'; Nyman 23'; Andersson 75' | Report | Nouri 6' (pen.); Ghoddos 53', 84' | Stadium: Nya Parken; Attendance: 7,421; Referee: Mohammed Al-Hakim |

| 23 July 2016 15 | IFK Norrköping | 2–0 | Gefle IF | Norrköping |
| 16:00 | Sjölund 29'; Blomqvist 56' | Report | | Stadium: Nya Parken; Attendance: 5,779; Referee: Andreas Ekberg |

| 30 July 2016 16 | GIF Sundsvall | 1–2 | IFK Norrköping | Sundsvall |
| 16:00 | Silva 24' | Report | Nyman 13', 63' | Stadium: Norrporten Arena; Attendance: 4,969; Referee: Patrik Eriksson |

| 7 August 2016 17 | IFK Norrköping | 3–1 | Örebro SK | Norrköping |
| 15:30 | Blomqvist 41'; Johansson 73'; Sjölund 79' | Report | Nordmark 40' | Stadium: Nya Parken; Attendance: 10,265; Referee: Kristoffer Karlsson |

| 10 August 2016 19* | IFK Norrköping | 3–1 | BK Häcken | Norrköping |
| 19:00 | Nyman 60' (pen.); Andersson 68'; Moberg Karlsson 79' | Report | Sjölund 36' (o.g.) | Stadium: Nya Parken; Attendance: 7,564; Referee: Mohammed Al-Hakim |

| 13 August 2016 18* | Gefle IF | 0–0 | IFK Norrköping | Gävle |
| 16:00 | | Report | | Stadium: Gavlevallen; Attendance: 2,730; Referee: Kaspar Sjöberg |

| 27 August 2016 20 | Kalmar FF | 0–1 | IFK Norrköping | Kalmar |
| 16:00 | | Report | Biskupović 79' (o.g.) | Stadium: Guldfågeln Arena; Attendance: 5,854; Referee: Johan Hamlin |

| 11 September 2016 21 | IFK Norrköping | 5–1 | Jönköpings Södra IF | Norrköping |
| 17:30 | Moberg Karlsson 12'; Andersson 15', 33'; Holmberg 28', 37' | Report | Smylie 88' | Stadium: Nya Parken; Attendance: 10,705; Referee: Markus Strömbergsson |

| 18 September 2016 22 | Helsingborgs IF | 1–2 | IFK Norrköping | Helsingborg |
| 15:00 | A. Wede 60' | Report | Andersson 14'; Eliasson 49' | Stadium: Olympia; Attendance: 6,578; Referee: Bojan Pandžić |

| 21 September 2016 23 | Östersunds FK | 0–2 | IFK Norrköping | Östersund |
| 19:00 | | Report | Andersson 28', 64' | Stadium: Jämtkraft Arena; Attendance: 5,676; Referee: Martin Strömbergsson |

| 26 September 2016 24 | IFK Norrköping | 1–3 | Djurgårdens IF | Norrköping |
| 19:00 | Holmberg 62' | Report | Gunnarsson 50'; Olunga 55'; Berntsen 84' | Stadium: Nya Parken; Attendance: 12,682; Referee: Kaspar Sjöberg |

| 2 October 2016 25 | AIK | 6–0 | IFK Norrköping | Solna |
| 17:30 | Ishizaki 31'; Isak 36', 74'; Ofori 57'; Obasi 63'; Markkanen 87' | Report | | Stadium: Friends Arena; Attendance: 17,157; Referee: Jonas Eriksson |

| 16 October 2016 26 | IFK Norrköping | 1–2 | Malmö FF | Norrköping |
| 15:00 | Bärkroth 48' | Report | Árnason 29'; Jeremejeff 69' | Stadium: Nya Parken; Attendance: 15,940; Referee: Stefan Johannesson |

| 23 October 2016 27 | IFK Norrköping | 2–1 | Falkenbergs FF | Norrköping |
| 15:00 | Wahlqvist 36'; Andersson 85' | Report | J. Karlsson 54' | Stadium: Nya Parken; Attendance: 5,723; Referee: Glenn Nyberg |

| 26 October 2016 28 | IF Elfsborg | v | IFK Norrköping | Borås |
| 19:00 | | Report | | Stadium: Borås Arena |

| 30 October 2016 29 | Hammarby IF | v | IFK Norrköping | Stockholm |
| 15:00 | | Report | | Stadium: Tele2 Arena |

| 6 November 2016 30 | IFK Norrköping | v | IFK Göteborg | Norrköping |
| 15:00 | | Report | | Stadium: Nya Parken |

Notes

- The match between IFK Norrköping and BK Häcken from round 19 was played before round 18

=== Svenska Cupen ===
Svenska Cupen, unlike Allsvenskan, spans over two seasons, with qualification in the fall and group stage and final stages in the spring. Therefore, IFK Norrköping will compete in both 2015–16 Svenska Cupen (group stage and final stages) and 2016–17 Svenska Cupen (qualification for next year group stage and final stages) for the 2016 season.

==== 2015–16 Svenska Cupen ====
2015–16 Svenska Cupen are being played during the fall in 2015 and in the spring of 2016, with the first two rounds in 2015 and the group stage and final stages in the beginning of 2016.

===== Group stage =====
IFK Norrköping were placed in group 1, as champions and winners of 2015 Allsvenskan, together with winners of 2015 Superettan (second tier), Jönköpings Södra IF, based on teams positions in the Swedish league system after 2015 season. This since first-ranked team are paired with sixteenth-ranked team in group 1, second-ranked team with fifteenth-ranked team in group 2 and so on to fill all eighth groups. One team from Allsvenskan did not qualify for group stage making winners from Superettan being the sixteenth seeded team. The draw amongst the unseeded teams to decide the last two teams was held on 26 November 2015, and IFK Norrköping and Jönköpings Södra IF were drawn together with Östersunds FK and AFC United. IFK Norrköping won their first two matches against Östersunds FK and AFC United, and could secure a place in the final stages with a draw in the last match against Jönköpings Södra IF.

| Pos | Team | Pld | W | D | L | GF | GA | GD | Pts | Qualification | IFKN | JSIF | ÖFK | AFC |
|---|---|---|---|---|---|---|---|---|---|---|---|---|---|---|
| 1 | IFK Norrköping | 3 | 2 | 1 | 0 | 6 | 1 | +5 | 7 | Advance to Knockout stage | — | 1–1 | 4–0 | — |
| 2 | Jönköpings Södra IF | 3 | 1 | 1 | 1 | 2 | 2 | 0 | 4 | | — | — | 1–0 | 0–1 |
| 3 | Östersunds FK | 3 | 1 | 0 | 2 | 3 | 5 | −2 | 3 | | — | — | — | 3–0 |
| 4 | AFC United | 3 | 1 | 0 | 2 | 1 | 4 | −3 | 3 | | 0–1 | — | — | — |

Source: Swedish Football Association
Rules for classification: 1) Points; 2) Goal difference; 3) Goals scored; 4) Head-to-head record; 5) Highest ranked team

Kickoff times are in CET (UTC+1) unless stated otherwise.

Win Draw Loss

| 20 February 2016 Matchday 1 | IFK Norrköping | 4–0 | Östersunds FK | Norrköping |
| 14:00 | Traustason 17'; Bärkroth 36'; Kujović 72'; Enarsson 90+2' | Report | | Stadium: Nya Parken; Attendance: 1,423; Referee: Johan Krantz |

| 27 February 2016 Matchday 2 | AFC United | 0–1 | IFK Norrköping | Solna |
| 13:00 | | Report | Kujović 53' | Stadium: Skytteholms IP; Attendance: 175; Referee: Lars Olsson |

| 6 March 2016 Matchday 3 | IFK Norrköping | 1–1 | Jönköpings Södra IF | Norrköping |
| 14:00 | Kujović 9' | Report | Smylie 17' | Stadium: Nya Parken; Attendance: 1,362; Referee: Kristoffer Karlsson |

===== Knockout stage =====
IFK Norrköping qualified for the knockout stage as group stage winners, but they were unseeded in the quarter-final draw because they were not one of the four teams with the best record in the group stage. In the quarter-finals they were drawn against seeded Malmö FF who had the advantage of playing at home.

Win Draw Loss

| 12 March 2016 Quarter-finals | Malmö FF | 1–0 | IFK Norrköping | Malmö |
| 14:30 | Kjartansson 47' | Report | | Stadium: Malmö IP; Attendance: 4,499; Referee: Mohammed Al-Hakim |

==== 2016–17 Svenska Cupen ====
2016–17 Svenska Cupen was played during the fall in 2016 and in the spring of 2017, with the first two rounds in 2016 and the group stage and final stages in the beginning of 2017.

===== Round 2 =====
IFK Norrköping entered Svenska Cupen in the second round (all teams from top tier Allsvenskan and second tier Superettan receive bye to this round). They were seeded in the draw together will all the other teams from Allsvenskan and Superettan, and they were drawn against an unseeded team (from third tier or lower). The winning team qualified for the group stage to be played in the beginning of the following season.

The draw was held on 7 July 2016 with IFK Norrköping being drawn against Västerås SK from Division 1 (3rd tier). The match was played on 24 August in Västerås (since the lower-tier team has home advantage in second round), and Norrköping advanced to the group stage after winning 4–0.

Kickoff times are in CET (UTC+1) unless stated otherwise.

Win Draw Loss

| 24 August 2016 Round 2 | Västerås SK | 0–4 | IFK Norrköping | Västerås |
| 20:00 | | Report | Eliasson 11', 22'; Holmberg 33'; Castegren 89' | Stadium: Solid Park Arena; Attendance: 3,621; Referee: Mohammed Al-Hakim |

=== UEFA Champions League ===
IFK Norrköping qualified for 2016–17 UEFA Champions League by winning 2015 Allsvenskan. They entered in second qualifying round and had to go through both the second and third qualifying round as well as the play-off round to reach the group stage, which is start of main tournament. However, they were eliminated in the second qualifying round against Rosenborg.

==== Qualifying phase and play-off round ====
In the qualifying phase and play-off round, each tie was played over two legs, with each team playing one leg at home. The team that scored more goals on aggregate over the two legs advanced to the next round. If the aggregate score was level, the away goals rule was applied, i.e., the team that scored more goals away from home over the two legs advanced. If away goals were also equal, then thirty minutes of extra time was played, divided into two fifteen-minutes halves. The away goals rule was again applied after extra time, i.e., if there were goals scored during extra time and the aggregate score was still level, the visiting team advanced by virtue of more away goals scored. If no goals were scored during extra time, the tie was decided by penalty shoot-out

Kickoff times are in CEST (UTC+2) unless stated otherwise.

===== Second qualifying round =====
The draw for the second qualifying round was held on 20 June 2016, and IFK Norrköping was drawn against Norwegian champions Rosenborg.

| 13 July 2016 First leg | Rosenborg (Norway) | 3–1 | (Sweden) IFK Norrköping | Trondheim |
| 19:15 | Eyjólfsson 48'; Helland 62'; De Lanlay 65' | Report | Andersson 70' | Stadium: Lerkendal Stadion; Referee: Davide Massa (Italy) |

| 20 July 2016 Second leg | IFK Norrköping (Sweden) | 3–2 (4–5 agg.) | (Norway) Rosenborg | Norrköping |
| 19:15 | Andersson 57', 77'; Nyman 59' | Report | Gytkjær 36' (pen.); De Lanlay 55' | Stadium: Nya Parken; Referee: Craig Pawson (England) |
