= 2017 IFK Norrköping season =

IFK Norrköping
2017 season
- Chairman: Peter Hunt
- Stadium: Nya Parken, Norrköping
- Allsvenskan: 10th
- Svenska Cupen: Final
- UEFA Europa League: Second qualifying round
- All statistics correct as of 24 October 2016.

Idrottsföreningen Kamraterna Norrköping, also known as IFK Norrköping or simply Norrköping, is a Swedish professional football club based in Norrköping.During the 2017 campaign they will be competing in the following competitions: Allsvenskan, Svenska Cupen.

== Allsvenskan ==
=== Results summary ===
Overall								Home						Away					
Pld	W	D	L	GF	GA	GD	Pts	W	D	L	GF	GA	GD	W	D	L	GF	GA	GD
17	8	3	6	25	24	+1	27	5	2	2	13	8	+5	3	1	4	12	16	−4

Last updated: 30 July 2017.

=== Results by matchday ===
Matchday	1	2	3	4	5	6	7	8	9	10	11	12	13	14	15	16	17	18	19	20	21	22	23	24	25	26	27	28	29	30
Ground	H	A	H	A	H	A	H	A	H	A	H	H	H	A	H	A	A	H	H	A	H	A	A	H	A	A	H	A	H	A
Result	W	L	L	W	W	D	D	W	W	W	W	D	W	L	L	L	L													
Position	4	8	14	7	3	3	5	4	3	3	2	2	2	3	3	3	6													

Updated to match(es) played on 30 July 2017. Source:
A = Away; H = Home; W = Win; D = Draw; L = Loss

== Matches ==
2 April 2017 Match 1	IFK Norrköping	2 - 1	Hammarby	Norrköping
17:30	Andersson 24'; Dagerstål 40'	Report	Aidoo (yellow card) 9'; Kristinsson (yellow card) 57'; Martinsson Ngouali (red card) 77'; Rômulo 90+1'	Stadium: Nya Parken; Attendance: 14,533; Referee: (Sweden) Kristoffer Karlsson

9 April 2017 Match 2	Östersunds FK	2 - 1	IFK Norrköping	Östersund
15:00	Aiesh 5'; Mensiro (yellow card) 31'; Keita (yellow card) 76'	Report	Smith (yellow card) 69'; Bärkroth (yellow card) 84'	Stadium: Jämtkraft Arena; Attendance: 4,644; Referee: (Sweden) Stefan Johannesson

17 April 2017 Match 3	IFK Norrköping	0 - 2	IK Sirius	Norrköping
17:30	Sjölund (yellow card) 24'; Wahlqvist (yellow card) 61'	Report	Busch Thor (yellow card) 36'; Ogbu 70'; Sirelius (yellow card) 76'; Skoglund (yellow card) 90'; Haglund 90+5'	Stadium: Nya Parken; Attendance: 7,098; Referee: (Sweden) Kaspar Sjöberg

23 April 2017 Match 4	BK Häcken	1 - 2	IFK Norrköping	Gothenburg
15:00	Kamara 22'; Farnerud (yellow card) 38'; Friberg (yellow card) 66'; Paulinho (yellow card) 68'	Report	Wahlqvist (yellow card) 42'; Bärkroth (yellow card) 45'; Fjóluson 52'; Telo (yellow card) 60'; Andersson 63'; Sjölund (yellow card) 85'	Stadium: Bravida Arena; Attendance: 2,593; Referee: (Sweden) Mohammed Al-Hakim

27 April 2017 Match 5	IFK Norrköping	3 - 0	Jönköpings Södra IF	Norrköping
19:00	Holmberg 45' 62'; Dagerstål 78'	Report	Fendrich (yellow card) 31'; Tamimi (yellow card) 87'	Stadium: Nya Parken; Attendance: 6,214; Referee: (Sweden) Jonas Eriksson

1 May 2017 Match 6	Djurgårdens IF	3 - 3	IFK Norrköping	Stockholm
17:30	Eriksson 23' 65'; Källström (yellow card) 25'; Kadewere 90+3'	Report	Telo 5'; Eliasson 28'; Þórarinsson 89' (yellow card) 90+4'	Stadium: Tele2 Arena; Attendance: 17,104; Referee: (Sweden) Stefan Johannesson

8 May 2017 Match 7	IFK Norrköping	0 - 0	GIF Sundsvall	Norrköping
19:00	Eliasson (yellow card) 86'	Report	Sigurðsson (yellow card) 73'; Olsson (yellow card) 83'	Stadium: Nya Parken; Attendance: 6,110; Referee: (Sweden) Markus Strömbergsson

12 May 2017 Match 8	AFC Eskilstuna	1 - 2	IFK Norrköping	Eskilstuna
19:00	Piermayr (yellow card) 45+1'; Eddahri 57'; Raskaj (yellow card) 88'	Report	Eliasson 7'; Holmberg 36'	Stadium: Tunavallen; Attendance: 3,565; Referee: (Sweden) Glenn Nyberg

16 May 2017 Match 9	IFK Norrköping	2 - 0	Kalmar FF	Norrköping
19:00	Fjóluson 35'; Bärkroth 59'; Smith (yellow card) 81'	Report	Nouri (yellow card) 48'; Biskupović (yellow card) 53'	Stadium: Nya Parken; Attendance: 7,452; Referee: (Sweden) Kristoffer Karlsson

21 May 2017 Match 10	Malmö FF	1 - 2	IFK Norrköping	Malmö
17:30	Rosenberg 76'; Svanberg (yellow card) 90'	Report	Telo (yellow card) 53'; Moberg Karlsson (yellow card) 61'; Fjóluson (yellow card) 72'; Sjölund 82'; Holmberg 85'	Stadium: Swedbank Stadion; Attendance: 20,145; Referee: (Sweden) Bojan Pandžić

27 May 2017 Match 11	IFK Norrköping	3 - 2	Halmstads BK	Norrköping
18:00	Holmberg 12' 51'; Bärkroth 47'	Report	Olsson 24'; Fjóluson 83' (o.g.)	Stadium: Nya Parken; Attendance: 9,105; Referee: (Sweden) Markus Strömbergsson

1 June 2017 Match 12	IFK Norrköping	0 - 0	AIK	Norrköping
19:00		Report	Karlsson (yellow card) 13'; Blomberg (yellow card) 18'; Olsson (yellow card) 64'	Stadium: Nya Parken; Attendance: 12,303; Referee: (Sweden) Stefan Johannesson

4 June 2017 Match 13	IFK Norrköping	2 - 0	IFK Göteborg	Norrköping
17:30	Moberg Karlsson 36'; Wahlqvist (yellow card) 53'; Eliasson 68'	Report	Eriksson (yellow card) 53'	Stadium: Nya Parken; Attendance: 10,233; Referee: (Sweden) Mohammed Al Hakim

2 July 2017 Match 14	Örebro SK	4 - 2	IFK Norrköping	Örebro
17:30	Sema 2' 37'; Almebäck (yellow card) 32'; Gerzić (yellow card) 35'; Besara 47' 50'	Report	Holmberg 29'; Eliasson (yellow card) 32'; Andersson 42'	Stadium: Behrn Arena; Attendance: 8,954; Referee: (Sweden) Andreas Ekberg

9 July 2017 Match 15	IFK Norrköping	v	IF Elfsborg	Norrköping
15:00				Stadium: Nya Parken

=== UEFA Europa League ===
29 June 2017 First Qualifying First Leg	(Sweden) IFK Norrköping	5 - 0	(Kosovo) FC Prishtina	Norrköping
20:00	Moberg Karlsson 10'; Andersson 23'; Eliasson 26'; Holmberg 31' 40'	Report	Mërgim Neziri (yellow card) 88'	Stadium: Nya Parken; Attendance: 6,540; Referee: (Latvia) A. Golubevs

6 July 2017 First Qualifying Second Leg	(Kosovo) FC Prishtina	0 - 1 (0 - 6 agg.)	(Sweden) IFK Norrköping	Mitrovica, Kosovo
20:00	Liridon Leci (yellow card) 12'; Diar Miftaraj (yellow card) 17'; Përparim Osmani (yellow card) 85'	Report	Andersson 71'	Stadium: Adem Jashari Olympic Stadium; Attendance: 1,300; Referee: (Denmark) Jens Maae

13 July 2017 Second Qualifying First Leg	(Sweden) IFK Norrköping	2 - 1	(Lithuania) FK Trakai	Norrköping
20:00	Andersson (yellow card) 23' (goal) 32'; Holmberg 61'; Eliasson (yellow card) 67'	Report	Maksimov (yellow card) 27' (goal) 66'; Dorley (yellow card) 89'	Stadium: Nya Parken; Attendance: 5,133; Referee: (France) Amaury Delerue

20 July 2017 Second Qualifying Second Leg	(Lithuania) FK Trakai	2 - 1 (a.e.t.) (3 - 3 agg.) (5 - 3 p)	(Sweden) IFK Norrköping	Vilnius
18:00	Maksimov 11' 35'; Svajūnas Čyžas (yellow card) 117'	Report	Sjölund (yellow card) 37'; Skrabb 86'	Stadium: LFF Stadium; Referee: (Netherlands) Dennis Higler
	Penalties
	Klimavičius (penalty scored); Modestas Vorobjovas (penalty scored); Svajūnas Čyžas (penalty scored); Mykhailo Shyshka (penalty scored); Justinas Januševskij (penalty scored)		Wahlqvist (penalty scored); Smith (penalty missed); Eliasson (penalty scored); Skrabb (penalty scored)
