= David Mitov Nilsson =

Macedonian footballer (born 1991)

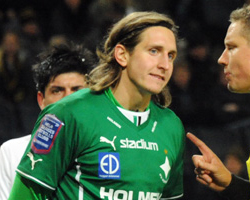
- Mitov Nilsson with IFK Norrköping in 2013

Personal information
- Full name: David Erik Johan Mitov Nilsson
- Date of birth: 12 January 1991 (age 35)
- Place of birth: Norrköping, Sweden
- Height: 1.90 m (6 ft 3 in)
- Position: Goalkeeper

Team information
- Current team: IFK Norrköping
- Number: 91

Youth career
- IFK Norrköping

Senior career*
| Years | Team | Apps | (Gls) |
| 2008–2019 | IFK Norrköping | 118 | (0) |
| 2011 | → IF Sylvia (loan) | 20 | (0) |
| 2019 | GIF Sundsvall | 11 | (0) |
| 2020 | Sarpsborg 08 | 26 | (0) |
| 2021–2024 | Sirius | 48 | (0) |
| 2024– | IFK Norrköping | 23 | (0) |

International career^{‡}
| 2008 | Sweden U17 | 2 | (0) |
| 2009–2010 | Sweden U19 | 4 | (0) |
| 2012 | Sweden U21 | 1 | (0) |
| 2014 | Sweden | 1 | (0) |
| 2015 | Macedonia | 1 | (0) |
- * Club domestic league appearances and goals as of 11 November 2026 ‡ National team caps and goals as of 12 October 2015

David Erik Johan Mitov Nilsson (Macedonian: Давид Ерик Јохан Митов Нилсон; born 12 January 1991) is a professional footballer who plays for IFK Norrköping as a goalkeeper. Born in Sweden, and a former Swedish international, he most recently played for the North Macedonia national team.

== International career ==
After making his senior debut for Sweden in a January 2014 friendly match against Iceland, Mitov Nilsson decided On 25 September 2015 to switch national teams to Macedonia, which he is eligible for since his mother was born in Macedonia. He made his first appearance for the Macedonia national football team on 12 October 2015 against Belarus in the UEFA Euro 2016 qualifiers.

== Career statistics ==
As of match played 30 January 2022

Appearances and goals by club, season and competition
| Club | Season | League | | | National Cup | | Continental | | Other | | Total | |
| Club | Season | Division | Apps | Goals | Apps | Goals | Apps | Goals | Apps | Goals | Apps | Goals |
|---|---|---|---|---|---|---|---|---|---|---|---|---|
| IFK Norrköping | 2009 | Superettan | 3 | 0 | 0 | 0 | — | | — | | 3 | 0 |
| IFK Norrköping | 2010 | Superettan | 0 | 0 | 1 | 0 | – | | – | | 1 | 0 |
| IFK Norrköping | 2011 | Allsvenskan | 0 | 0 | 0 | 0 | — | | — | | 0 | 0 |
| IFK Norrköping | 2012 | Allsvenskan | 19 | 0 | 4 | 0 | – | | – | | 23 | 0 |
| IFK Norrköping | 2013 | Allsvenskan | 25 | 0 | 4 | 0 | – | | – | | 29 | 0 |
| IFK Norrköping | 2014 | Allsvenskan | 20 | 0 | 2 | 0 | – | | – | | 22 | 0 |
| IFK Norrköping | 2015 | Allsvenskan | 30 | 0 | 2 | 0 | – | | 1 (Note: Appearance in the Svenska Supercupen) | 0 | 33 | 0 |
| IFK Norrköping | 2016 | Allsvenskan | 5 | 0 | 1 | 0 | – | | – | | 6 | 0 |
| IFK Norrköping | 2017 | Allsvenskan | 15 | 0 | 0 | 0 | 2 (Note: Appearance in the Europa League) | 0 | – | | 17 | 0 |
| IFK Norrköping | 2018 | Allsvenskan | 0 | 0 | 1 | 0 | — | | —– | | 1 | 0 |
| IFK Norrköping | 2019 | Allsvenskan | 0 | 0 | 2 | 0 | – | | – | | 2 | 0 |
| IFK Norrköping | Total | | 117 | 0 | 17 | 0 | 2 | 0 | 1 | 0 | 137 | 0 |
| IF Sylvia (loan) | 2011 | Division 1 Södra | 11 | 0 | 0 | 0 | – | | — | | 11 | 0 |
| GIF Sundsvall | 2019 | Allsvenskan | 11 | 0 | 1 | 0 | — | | — | | 12 | 0 |
| Sarpsborg 08 | 2020 | Eliteserien | 26 | 0 | 0 | 0 | – | | – | | 26 | 0 |
| IK Sirius | 2021 | Allsvenskan | 17 | 0 | 3 | 0 | — | | — | | 20 | 0 |
| IK Sirius | 2022 | Allsvenskan | 0 | 0 | 0 | 0 | – | | – | | 0 | 0 |
| IK Sirius | Total | | 17 | 0 | 3 | 0 | 2 | 0 | 1 | 0 | 20 | 0 |
| Career total | | | 182 | 0 | 21 | 0 | 2 | 0 | 1 | 0 | 206 | 0 |
