= Niclas Eliasson =

Swedish football player

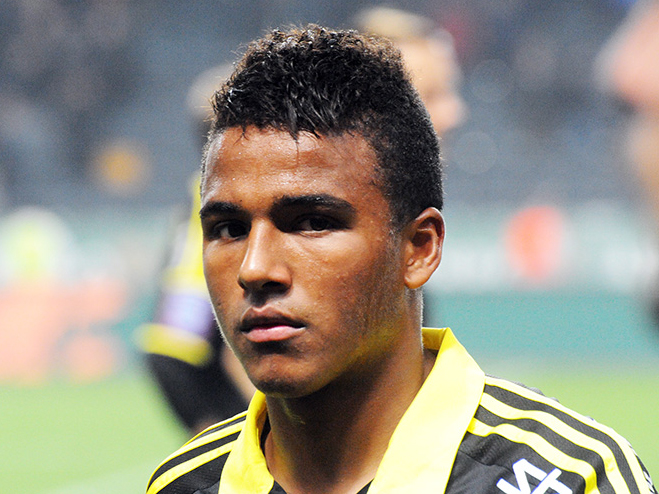
- Eliasson playing for AIK in 2014

Personal information
- Full name: Per Niclas Eliasson Santana
- Date of birth: 7 December 1995 (age 30)
- Place of birth: Falkenberg, Sweden
- Height: 1.78 m (5 ft 10 in)
- Position: Winger

Team information
- Current team: Internacional (on loan from AEK Athens)
- Number: 17

Youth career
- Arvidstorps IK
- 2002–2012: Falkenbergs FF

Senior career*
Years	Team	Apps	(Gls)
2013	Falkenbergs FF	29	(1)
2014–2016	AIK	31	(1)
2016	→ IFK Norrköping (loan)	13	(1)
2017	IFK Norrköping	17	(3)
2017–2020	Bristol City	83	(5)
2020–2022	Nîmes	68	(11)
2022–	AEK Athens	101	(11)
2026–	→ Internacional (loan)	0	(0)

International career^{‡}
2012	Sweden U17	2	(0)
2013–2014	Sweden U19	10	(1)
2017	Sweden U21	2	(0)
2024–	Sweden	9	(0)
- * Club domestic league appearances and goals as of 18:13, 18 August 2026 (UTC) ‡ National team caps and goals as of 10 September 2025

Per Niclas Eliasson Santana (Swedish pronunciation: [ˈnɪ̌kːlas ɛˈlîːaˌsɔn]; born 7 December 1995) is a Swedish professional footballer who plays as a winger for Campeonato Brasileiro Série A club Internacional, on loan from Greek Super League side AEK Athens, and the Sweden national team.

He formerly represented Sweden at under-17, under-19, and under-21 level.

== Club career ==
=== Falkenbergs FF ===
Eliasson graduated from the youth academy into the senior team in 2013. He played 29 games, scoring once but assisting 13 times.

=== AIK ===
On 1 January 2014, Eliasson signed for AIK for an undisclosed fee. From 2014 to 2016, he played 31 times, scoring once.

==== Loan to IFK Norrköping ====
On 28 July 2016, Eliasson joined IFK Norrköping on loan for the season. He featured 13 times and scored once.

=== IFK Norrköping ===
After a successful loan spell, IFK Norrköping signed Eliasson on a permanent transfer for an undisclosed fee. He played 13 times, scoring three goals.

=== Bristol City ===
Eliasson signed for Bristol City in August 2017 for an undisclosed fee – reported to be around £1,800,000. He made his debut against Birmingham City and scored his first goal for the club in a League Cup win against Premier League Watford on 22 August 2017. After only making sporadic appearances in his debut season, Eliasson revealed how he worked hard over the summer to make sure that he was in the best condition possible for the next season. Eliasson scored his first league goal that season – an 89th minute winner away at Brentford. Eliasson finished the 2018–19 season with 3 goals and was the top assister at the club with 6 assists.

=== Nîmes ===
In 2020, Eliasson signed for Ligue 1 club Nîmes. During the 2020–21 season, he scored 4 goals in 30 league appearances, notably including a brace in a 2–1 away win over Marseille. However, his side were relegated in 19th place at the end of the campaign.

=== AEK Athens ===
On 27 August 2022, AEK Athens made an official offer in the excess of €2,000,000 to acquire the services of Eliasson. Two days later, Eliasson signed a five-year contract with the Greek club.

== International career ==
Eliasson made his debut for the Sweden national team on 5 June 2024 in a friendly against Denmark. he started and played 86 minutes in a 1–2 loss at Parken Stadium before being replaced by Emil Holm.

== Style of play ==
Eliasson's main skill is undoubtedly his crossing ability. He uses this to great effect against defenders as he can successfully cross the ball in tight areas. His preferred foot is his left, however Eliasson can comfortably use his weaker foot as well. After scoring against Brentford, Eliasson revealed how he has been working on becoming more effective in front of goal. Since then, he improved greatly and his trademark goal of cutting onto his left foot and bending it to the far corner – doing this against QPR and Bolton.

== Personal life ==
Eliasson was born in Sweden to a Swedish father and a Brazilian mother.

== Career statistics ==
=== Club ===
As of match played 24 October 2025

Appearances and goals by club, season and competition
Club	Season	League			National cup (Note: Includes Svenska Cupen, FA Cup, Coupe de France, Greek Football Cup)		League cup (Note: Includes EFL Cup)		Europe		Total	
Club	Season	Division	Apps	Goals	Apps	Goals	Apps	Goals	Apps	Goals	Apps	Goals
Falkenberg	2012	Superettan	0	0	3	0	—		—		3	0
Falkenberg	2013	Superettan	29	1	1	0	—		—		30	1
Falkenberg	Total		29	1	4	0	—		—		33	1
AIK	2014	Allsvenskan	16	1	2	0	—		0	0	18	1
AIK	2015	Allsvenskan	10	0	5	1	—		5 (Note: Appearances in UEFA Europa League)	0	20	1
AIK	2016	Allsvenskan	5	0	0	0	—		0	0	5	0
AIK	Total		31	1	7	1	—		5	0	43	2
IFK Norrköping (loan)	2016	Allsvenskan	13	1	1	2	—		—		14	3
IFK Norrköping	2017	Allsvenskan	17	3	6	1	—		4	1	27	5
Bristol City	2017–18	Championship	13	0	1	0	3	1	—		17	1
Bristol City	2018–19	Championship	33	2	3	1	0	0	—		36	3
Bristol City	2019–20	Championship	37	3	2	0	1	0	—		40	3
Bristol City	2020–21	Championship	0	0	0	0	2	0	—		2	0
Bristol City	Total		83	5	6	1	6	1	—		95	7
Nîmes	2020–21	Ligue 1	30	4	1	0	0	0	—		31	4
Nîmes	2021–22	Ligue 2	36	7	3	0	0	0	—		39	7
Nîmes	2022–23	Ligue 2	2	0	—		—		—		2	0
Nîmes	Total		68	11	4	0	0	0	—		72	11
AEK Athens	2022–23	Super League Greece	26	0	4	0	—		—		30	0
AEK Athens	2023–24	Super League Greece	36	8	1	0	—		10 (Note: Four appearances in UEFA Champions League, six appearances in UEFA Europa League)	0	47	8
AEK Athens	2024–25	Super League Greece	21	3	4	0	—		3 (Note: Appearances in UEFA Conference League)	0	28	3
AEK Athens	2025–26	Super League Greece	7	0	2	0	—		4	2	13	2
AEK Athens	Total		90	11	11	0	—		17	2	118	13
Career total			331	24	39	5	6	1	26	3	402	42

=== International ===
As of match played 5 September 2025

Appearances and goals by national team and year
National team	Year	Apps	Goals
Sweden	2024	6	0
Sweden	2025	3	0
Total		9	0

== Honours ==
AEK Athens

- Super League Greece: 2022–23, 2025–26
- Greek Cup: 2022–23

Individual

- Super League Greece Player of the Month: October 2023
- Super League Greece Team of the Season: 2023–24
- AEK Athens Player of the Season: 2023–24
