= Filip Dagerstål =

Swedish footballer (born 1997)

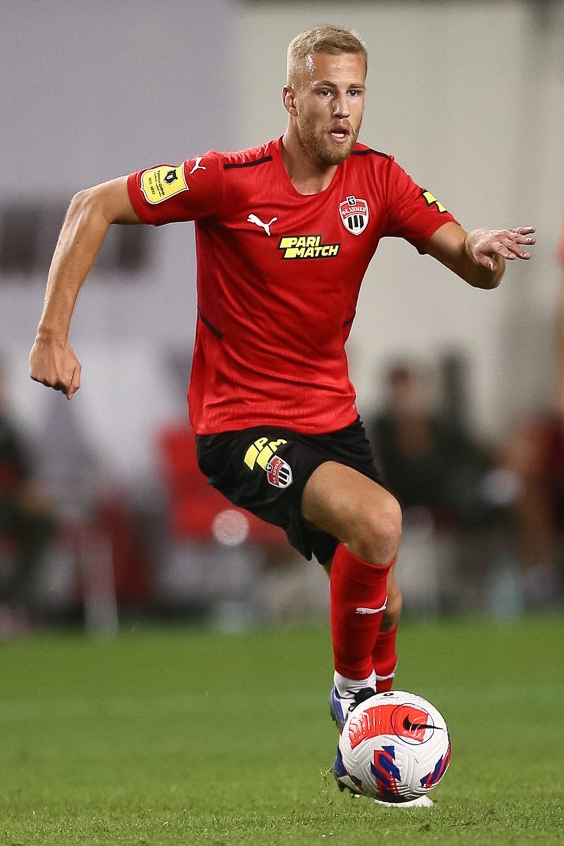
- Dagerstål with FC Khimki in 2021

Personal information
- Full name: Per Filip Dagerstål
- Date of birth: 1 February 1997 (age 29)
- Place of birth: Norrköping, Sweden
- Height: 1.90 m (6 ft 3 in)
- Positions: Defensive midfielder; centre-back

Team information
- Current team: IFK Norrköping
- Number: 25

Senior career*
Years	Team	Apps	(Gls)
2013–2020	IFK Norrköping	132	(6)
2013	→ IF Sylvia (loan)	1	(0)
2015	→ IF Sylvia (loan)	4	(0)
2021–2023	FC Khimki	27	(0)
2022	→ IFK Norrköping (loan)	11	(0)
2022–2023	→ Lech Poznań (loan)	20	(0)
2023–2025	Lech Poznań	7	(1)
2023	Lech Poznań II	2	(0)
2026–	IFK Norrköping	16	(0)

International career
2013–2014	Sweden U17	9	(0)
2014–2016	Sweden U19	13	(0)
2016–2018	Sweden U21	19	(2)
2017–2019	Sweden	2	(0)
- * Club domestic league appearances and goals as of 11 November 2026

Filip Dagerstål (born 1 February 1997) is a Swedish professional footballer who plays as a defensive midfielder or centre-back for Superettan club IFK Norrköping.

== Club career ==
=== IFK Norrköping ===
Dagerstål, a native of Norrköping, began training at IFK Norrköping at four years old. He spent the 2013 season at loan at IF Sylvia, making his professional debut for them coming on in the last minute in a 2–1 victory over IF Limhamn Bunkeflo. In the following 2014 season, he made his senior debut for IFK Norrköping, appearing twice in that year's Allsvenskan. He scored his first goal for Norrköping during 2015 against Halmstad BK, and made five more appearances during IFK's successful run for the Swedish championship in 2015. Dagerstål himself was however again loaned out to IF Sylvia during the conclusion of the season. During the following years, he mainly came on as a substitute before stabilizing himself as a starter at the centre-back position during the 2019 and 2020 seasons. Following the 2020 campaign, and 132 league appearances for IFK, he chose to not renew his contract, and instead pursue a career abroad.

=== FC Khimki ===
On 23 January 2021, Dagerstål signed with Russian Premier League club FC Khimki. On 7 March 2022, FIFA introduced special regulations related to the Russian invasion of Ukraine. Those regulations allowed foreign players in Russia to unilaterally temporarily suspend their contracts with their Russian clubs until the end of the 2021–22 season and join clubs outside of Russia until that date. On 17 March 2022, Dagerstål used the new rule to return to IFK Norrköping until 30 June. On 5 July 2022, Dagerstål suspended his Khimki contract for the 2022–23 season under the same FIFA regulations that have been extended for a year.

=== Lech Poznań ===
On 26 July 2022, Polish side Lech Poznań announced the signing of Dagerstål on a one-year contract. On 24 May 2023, after FIFA prolonged the regulations until 30 June 2024, it was announced that he would remain at Lech until his contract with Khimki expires, and then join the club on a permanent basis.

On 28 October 2023, he sustained an ankle injury during a 1–1 league draw against Cracovia. Initially expected to be out of action for three to six weeks, he missed the rest of the season and the first half of the following campaign. In March 2025, two months after resuming training, he underwent another surgery on his ankle which would sideline him for the remainder of the 2024–25 season. His contract was terminated by mutual consent on 25 June 2025.

== Career statistics ==
=== Club ===
As of match played 28 October 2023.

Appearances and goals by club, season and competition
Club	Season	League			National cup (Note: Includes Svenska Cupen)		Continental		Other		Total	
Club	Season	Division	Apps	Goals	Apps	Goals	Apps	Goals	Apps	Goals	Apps	Goals
IFK Norrköping	2014	Allsvenskan	2	0	0	0	—		—		2	0
IFK Norrköping	2015	Allsvenskan	6	1	3	0	—		1 (Note: Appearance in Swedish Super Cup)	0	10	1
IFK Norrköping	2016	Allsvenskan	16	0	0	0	1 (Note: Appearance(s) in UEFA Champions League)	0	—		17	0
IFK Norrköping	2017	Allsvenskan	28	2	7	0	4 (Note: Appearances in UEFA Europa League)	0	—		39	2
IFK Norrköping	2018	Allsvenskan	24	2	2	1	—		—		26	3
IFK Norrköping	2019	Allsvenskan	27	1	4	0	6	0	—		37	1
IFK Norrköping	2020	Allsvenskan	29	0	1	0	—		—		30	0
IFK Norrköping	Total		132	6	17	1	11	0	1	0	161	7
IF Sylvia (loan)	2013	Division 1 Norra	1	0	—		—		—		1	0
IF Sylvia (loan)	2015	Division 2 Södra Svealand	4	0	—		—		—		4	0
FC Khimki	2020–21	RPL	10	0	—		—		—		10	0
FC Khimki	2021–22	RPL	17	0	—		—		—		17	0
FC Khimki	Total		27	0	0	0	0	0	0	0	27	0
IFK Norrköping (loan)	2022	Allsvenskan	11	0	—		—		—		11	0
Lech Poznań (loan)	2022–23	Ekstraklasa	20	0	0	0	12 (Note: Appearance(s) in UEFA Europa Conference League)	0	—		32	0
Lech Poznań	2023–24	Ekstraklasa	7	1	0	0	1	0	—		8	1
Lech Poznań	2024–25	Ekstraklasa	0	0	0	0	—		—		0	0
Lech Poznań	Total		27	1	0	0	13	0	0	0	40	1
Lech Poznań II	2023–24	II liga	2	0	0	0	—		—		2	0
Career total			204	7	17	1	24	0	1	0	246	8

=== International ===
Appearances and goals by national team and year
National team	Year	Apps	Goals
Sweden	2017	1	0
Sweden	2018	0	0
Sweden	2019	1	0
Total		2	0

== Honours ==
IFK Norrköping

- Allsvenskan: 2015
- Svenska Supercupen: 2015
