= Christopher Telo =

English-born Swedish footballer (born 1989)

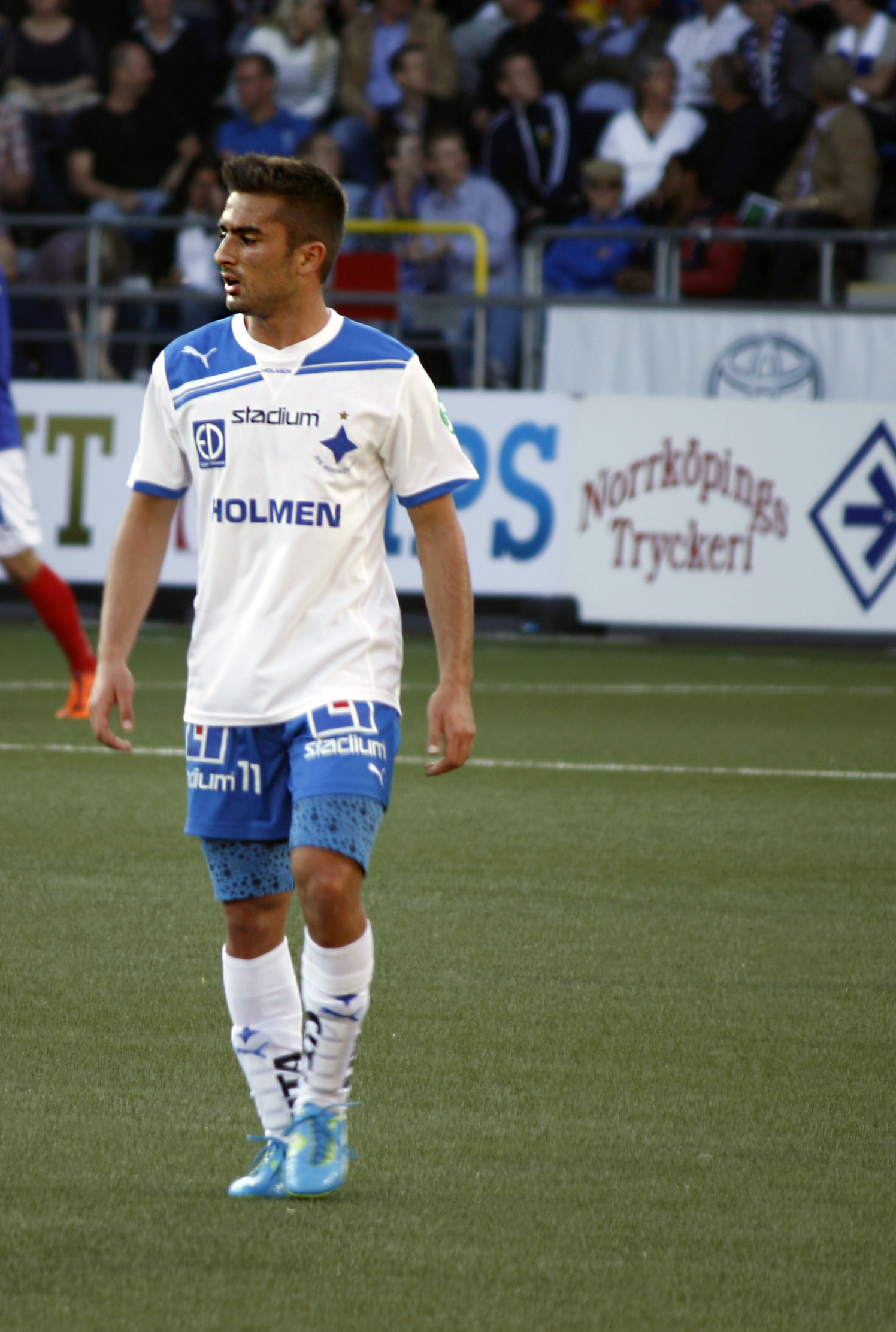
- Telo with IFK Norrköping in 2012

Personal information
- Full name: Christopher Rasmus Nilsson Telo
- Date of birth: 4 November 1989 (age 37)
- Place of birth: London, England
- Height: 1.72 m (5 ft 8 in)
- Positions: Left back; winger

Youth career
- Kimstad GoIF
- 2002–2006: IFK Norrköping

Senior career*
Years	Team	Apps	(Gls)
2007–2017	IFK Norrköping	214	(21)
2017–2019	Molde	5	(0)
2019–2023	IFK Norrköping	37	(0)

International career
2006	Sweden U19	3	(1)
- * Club domestic league appearances and goals as of 15 November 2023

Christopher Rasmus Nilsson Telo (born 4 November 1989), known as Christopher Telo, is a former professional footballer who played as a left back. Born in England, he represents Sweden at youth level.

== Career ==
=== Club ===
==== IFK Norrköping ====
In the 2015 season, Telo played 23 league games for Norrköping who became Swedish champions by winning Allsvenskan.

==== Molde ====
On 28 July 2017, Telo signed for Molde FK on a contract until the end of the 2020 season. He was injury-plagued during his first year at the club. On 26 July 2019, Molde announced that Telo and Molde had agreed to terminate his contract one and a half year before its end date. He played a total of 10 games for Molde.

==== Return to IFK Norrköping ====
On 27 July 2019, the day after his contract with Molde was terminated, Telo agreed to rejoin IFK Norrköping.

== Personal life ==
He is the son of a Swedish mother and a Brazilian father.

== Career statistics ==
=== Club ===
As of match played 1 March 2022

Appearances and goals by club, season and competition
Club	Season	League			National Cup		Continental		Other		Total	
Club	Season	Division	Apps	Goals	Apps	Goals	Apps	Goals	Apps	Goals	Apps	Goals
IFK Norrköping	2007	Superettan	1	0	–		–		–		1	0
IFK Norrköping	2008	Allsvenskan	11	1	–		–		–		12	1
IFK Norrköping	2009	Superettan	17	5	1	0	–		–		18	5
IFK Norrköping	2010	Superettan	19	3	2	0	–		–		21	3
IFK Norrköping	2011	Allsvenskan	27	5	2	0	–		–		29	5
IFK Norrköping	2012	Allsvenskan	18	0	1	0	–		–		19	0
IFK Norrköping	2013	Allsvenskan	27	5	5	1	–		–		32	6
IFK Norrköping	2014	Allsvenskan	28	0	4	1	–		–		32	1
IFK Norrköping	2015	Allsvenskan	23	0	4	0	–		1 (Note: Appearance in the Svenska Supercupen)	0	28	0
IFK Norrköping	2016	Allsvenskan	27	1	4	0	2 (Note: Appearance in the Champions League)	0	–		33	1
IFK Norrköping	2017	Allsvenskan	15	1	6	0	3 (Note: Appearance in the Europa League)	0	–		24	1
IFK Norrköping	Total		214	21	29	2	5	0	1	0	249	23
Molde	2017	Eliteserien	2	0	–		–		–		2	0
Molde	2018	Eliteserien	2	0	2	0	–		–		4	0
Molde	2019	Eliteserien	1	0	3	0	–		–		4	0
Molde	Total		5	0	5	0	0	0	0	0	10	0
IFK Norrköping	2019	Allsvenskan	1	0	–		–		–		1	0
IFK Norrköping	2020	Allsvenskan	9	0	3	0	–		–		12	0
IFK Norrköping	2021	Allsvenskan	21	0	2	0	–		–		23	0
IFK Norrköping	2022	Allsvenskan	0	0	2	0	–		–		2	0
IFK Norrköping	Total		31	0	7	0	0	0	0	0	39	0
Career total			250	21	41	2	5	0	1	0	298	23

== Honours ==
IFK Norrköping

- Allsvenskan: 2015
- Svenska Supercupen: 2015
