= Linus Wahlqvist =

Swedish footballer (born 1996)

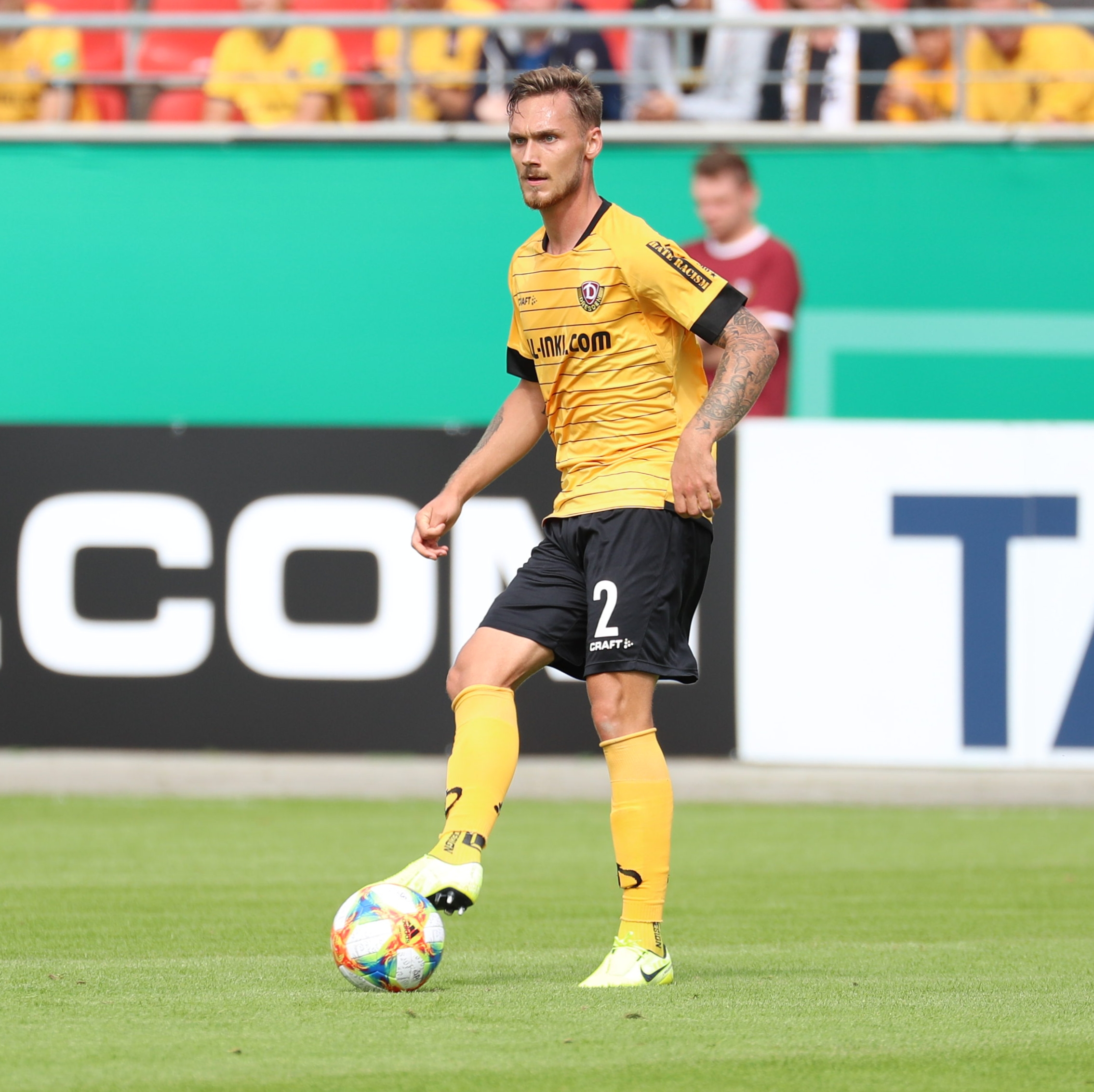
- Wahlqvist playing for Dynamo Dresden in 2019

Personal information
- Full name: Rolf Linus Wahlqvist Egnell
- Date of birth: 11 November 1996 (age 30)
- Place of birth: Norrköping, Sweden
- Height: 1.84 m (6 ft 0 in)
- Position: Right-back

Team information
- Current team: Pogoń Szczecin
- Number: 28

Youth career
- –2009: Eneby BK
- 2009–2013: IFK Norrköping

Senior career*
Years	Team	Apps	(Gls)
2014–2018	IFK Norrköping	121	(7)
2018–2020	Dynamo Dresden	54	(0)
2020–2022	IFK Norrköping	71	(4)
2023–	Pogoń Szczecin	104	(3)

International career^{‡}
2011–2013	Sweden U17	28	(1)
2013–2015	Sweden U19	17	(0)
2015–2018	Sweden U21	29	(1)
2016–2024	Sweden	16	(0)
Medal record
Men's football
Representing Sweden
FIFA U-17 World Cup
Third place	2013 UAE
- * Club domestic league appearances and goals as of 09:08, 24 August 2026 (UTC) ‡ National team caps and goals as of 5 September 2024

Rolf Linus Wahlqvist Egnell (born 11 November 1996) is a Swedish professional footballer who plays for Pogoń Szczecin as a right-back.

== Career ==
Wahlqvist arrived at IFK Norrköping from his boyhood club Eneby BK in 2009. For the 2013 Allsvenskan season he was moved up to the first team where he eventually switched position from central defender to right fullback at the start of the following year. On 6 April 2014, he made his Allsvenskan debut in the 2–0 win against Helsingborgs IF.

In July 2018, Wahlqvist joined 2. Bundesliga side Dynamo Dresden on a four-year contract. The transfer fee was undisclosed.

In July 2020, Wahlqvist announced that he would leave Dynamo Dresden upon the team's relegation to 3. Liga, activating a clause in his contract to terminate it in with immediate effect.

He left on 4 August 2020 to join Norrköping.

On 10 December 2022, it was announced Wahlqvist would join Polish Ekstraklasa club Pogoń Szczecin on a deal until June 2026, starting from 1 January 2023.

== International career ==
In September 2013 Wahlqvist was selected to the Sweden men's national under-17 football team that would compete in the 2013 FIFA U-17 World Cup, in which he helped the team to the bronze medal.

Wahlqvist was also a part of the Sweden U21 team that competed at the 2017 UEFA European Under-21 Championship, in which he missed a crucial penalty kick against England before Sweden was eliminated in the group stage of the tournament.

Wahlqvist made his senior international debut for Sweden against Estonia in January 2016.

== Career statistics ==
=== Club ===
As of match played 28 February

Appearances and goals by club, season and competition
Club	Season	League			National cup (Note: Includes Svenska Cupen, DFB-Pokal)		Continental		Other		Total	
Club	Season	Division	Apps	Goals	Apps	Goals	Apps	Goals	Apps	Goals	Apps	Goals
IFK Norrköping	2014	Allsvenskan	24	0	—		—		—		29	0
IFK Norrköping	2015	Allsvenskan	29	3	5	0	—		1 (Note: Appearance in Svenska Supercupen)	0	30	3
IFK Norrköping	2016	Allsvenskan	28	2	5	0	2 (Note: Appearances in UEFA Champions League)	0	—		35	2
IFK Norrköping	2017	Allsvenskan	28	2	7	1	4 (Note: Appearances in UEFA Europa League)	0	—		39	3
IFK Norrköping	2018	Allsvenskan	12	0	3	0	—		—		15	0
IFK Norrköping	Total		121	7	20	1	6	0	1	0	147	8
Dynamo Dresden	2018–19	2. Bundesliga	29	0	—		—		—		29	0
Dynamo Dresden	2019–20	2. Bundesliga	25	0	1	0	—		—		26	0
Dynamo Dresden	Total		54	0	1	0	0	0	0	0	55	0
IFK Norrköping	2020	Allsvenskan	17	1	—		—		—		17	1
IFK Norrköping	2021	Allsvenskan	28	3	3	0	—		—		31	3
IFK Norrköping	2022	Allsvenskan	—		2	1	—		—		2	1
IFK Norrköping	Total		45	4	5	1	0	0	0	0	50	5
Career total			220	11	26	2	6	0	1	0	252	13

=== International ===
As of match played 5 September 2024

Appearances and goals by national team and year
National team	Year	Apps	Goals
Sweden
Sweden	2016	3	0
Sweden	2017	2	0
Sweden	2018	1	0
Sweden	2019	0	0
Sweden	2020	0	0
Sweden	2021	0	0
Sweden	2022	0	0
Sweden	2023	8	0
Sweden	2024	2	0
Total		16	0

== Honours ==
IFK Norrköping

- Allsvenskan: 2015
- Svenska Supercupen: 2015

Sweden U17

- FIFA U-17 World Cup third place: 2013
