= Ian Sirelius =

Swedish footballer

Personal information
- Full name: Ian Alexander Sirelius
- Date of birth: 28 October 1987 (age 39)
- Place of birth: Stockholm, Sweden
- Position: Winger

Youth career
- IF Hermelinerna
- IF Brommapojkarna

Senior career*
Years	Team	Apps	(Gls)
2006–2007	Ängby IF		
2008	Råsunda IS	20	(2)
2009–2010	Gröndals IK	38	(3)
2011–2019	IK Sirius	134	(20)
Total		192	(25)
- * Club domestic league appearances and goals

Ian Sirelius (born 28 October 1987) is a Swedish former professional footballer who played as a winger.

== Career ==
=== Later career ===
After nine years at IK Sirius, Sirelius left the club at the end of 2019, where his contract expired.He then announced his retirement from football on 31 January 2020.

After retiring, Sirelius then continued his position as a project manager at Gröndals IK. However to an extended extent, a position he had had for a few years alongside his playing career.
