= Christoffer Nyman =

Swedish footballer (born 1992)

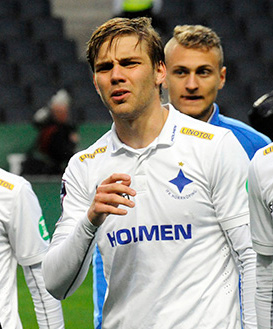
- Nyman with IFK Norrköping in 2015

Personal information
- Full name: Christoffer Åke Sven Nyman
- Date of birth: 5 October 1992 (age 34)
- Place of birth: Norrköping, Sweden
- Height: 1.83 m (6 ft 0 in)
- Position: Forward

Team information
- Current team: IFK Norrköping
- Number: 5

Youth career
- 1997–2009: IFK Norrköping

Senior career*
Years	Team	Apps	(Gls)
2010–2016	IFK Norrköping	149	(38)
2011	→ IF Sylvia (loan)	4	(1)
2016–2018	Eintracht Braunschweig	55	(17)
2019–	IFK Norrköping	205	(93)

International career^{‡}
2011–2012	Sweden U19	3	(1)
2013–2014	Sweden U21	4	(1)
2013–2023	Sweden	11	(2)
- * Club domestic league appearances and goals as of 11 November 2026 ‡ National team caps and goals as of 22:34, 9 January 2023 (UTC)

Christoffer Åke Sven "Totte" Nyman (born 5 October 1992) is a Swedish professional footballer who plays as a forward for Swedish club IFK Norrköping.

== Club career ==
=== Youth career ===
Nyman was born in Norrköping and grew up close to the IFK Norrköping home stadium. He joined the youth ranks of the club at five years of age and growing up he worked at the home games both as a ball boy and with selling candy. Eventually he also joined the singing section during the games.

=== IFK Norrköping ===
Nyman moved up to play in IFK Norrköping's first team in 2010 where he featured in three games, scoring each time. His third and final goal helped secure the club's promotion to Allsvenskan. After the season, he was given the "Youth Player of the Year" award.

The following year he made his Allsvenskan debut but was also sent on loan to third tier club IF Sylvia to get more playing time.

In 2012, he had his big breakthrough at the highest Swedish level, scoring 8 goals in 29 games for Norrköping.

During the start of the 2013 Allsvenskan season Nyman struggled to perform after suffering from unknown stomach problems.

After a successful first half of the 2015 Allsvenskan Norrköping turned down two bids from FC Groningen and Osmanlıspor to buy Nyman during the summer. The club cited their ambition to win the league as the reason for keeping him and at the end of the year they did end up becoming champions for the first time in 26 years. He played a key role in their success and he was arguably their best player.

=== Eintracht Braunschweig ===
In August 2016, Nyman transferred to German 2. Bundesliga club Eintracht Braunschweig.

=== Return to IFK Norrköping ===
In January 2019, Nyman returned to IFK Norrköping having agreed a four-year contract.

== International career ==
In 2013 Nyman was called up for the January Sweden men's national football team tour in Asia where he made his debut. A few months later he also played his first Sweden national under-21 football team game in a friendly against the England national under-21 football team.

On 3 September 2017, he scored his first senior goal for Sweden, in a 2018 FIFA World Cup qualifying game against Belarus, which Sweden won 4–0.

== Career statistics ==
=== Club ===
As of match played 19 September 2025

Appearances and goals by club, season and competition
Club	Season	League			National cup (Note: Includes Svenska Cupen, DFB-Pokal)		Continental		Other		Total	
Club	Season	Division	Apps	Goals	Apps	Goals	Apps	Goals	Apps	Goals	Apps	Goals
IFK Norrköping	2010	Superettan	3	3	0	0	—		—		3	3
IFK Norrköping	2011	Allsvenskan	11	0	0	0	—		—		11	0
IFK Norrköping	2012	Allsvenskan	29	8	0	0	—		—		29	8
IFK Norrköping	2013	Allsvenskan	28	4	4	2	—		—		32	6
IFK Norrköping	2014	Allsvenskan	30	4	3	0	—		—		33	4
IFK Norrköping	2015	Allsvenskan	29	10	0	0	—		—		29	10
IFK Norrköping	2016	Allsvenskan	19	9	5	2	2	1	—		26	12
IFK Norrköping	Total		149	38	12	4	2	1	0	0	163	43
IF Sylvia (loan)	2011	Division 1	4	1	0	0	—		—		4	1
Eintracht Braunschweig	2016–17	2. Bundesliga	31	11	0	0	—		2	0	33	11
Eintracht Braunschweig	2017–18	2. Bundesliga	18	5	1	1	—		—		19	6
Eintracht Braunschweig	2018–19	3. Liga	6	1	0	0	—		—		6	1
Eintracht Braunschweig	Total		55	17	1	1	0	0	2	0	59	18
IFK Norrköping	2019	Allsvenskan	29	10	2	0	6	0	—		37	10
IFK Norrköping	2020	Allsvenskan	28	18	1	3	—		—		29	21
IFK Norrköping	2021	Allsvenskan	16	5	4	5	—		—		20	10
IFK Norrköping	2022	Allsvenskan	29	11	4	0	—		—		33	11
IFK Norrköping	2023	Allsvenskan	26	8	4	2	—		—		30	10
IFK Norrköping	2024	Allsvenskan	25	11	3	4	—		—		28	15
IFK Norrköping	2025	Allsvenskan	21	10	1	1	—		—		22	11
IFK Norrköping	Total		174	73	19	15	6	0	—		199	88
Career total			382	129	32	20	8	1	2	0	424	150

=== International ===
Appearances and goals by national team and year
National team	Year	Apps	Goals
Sweden	2013	1	0
Sweden	2014	1	0
Sweden	2015	0	0
Sweden	2016	5	0
Sweden	2017	3	1
Sweden	2018	0	0
Sweden	2019	0	0
Sweden	2020	0	0
Sweden	2021	0	0
Sweden	2022	0	0
Sweden	2023	1	1
Total		11	2

Scores and results list Sweden's goal tally first, score column indicates score after each Nyman goal.

List of international goals scored by Christoffer Nyman
No.	Date	Venue	Opponent	Score	Result	Competition
1	3 September 2017	Borisov Arena, Barysaw, Belarus	Belarus	2–0	4–0	2018 FIFA World Cup qualification
2	9 January 2023	Estádio Algarve, Faro/Loulé, Portugal	Finland	1–0	2–0	Friendly

== Honours ==
IFK Norrköping

- Allsvenskan: 2015
- Svenska Supercupen: 2015

Individual

- Allsvenskan top scorer: 2020
