= Emir Kujović =

Swedish footballer (born 1988)

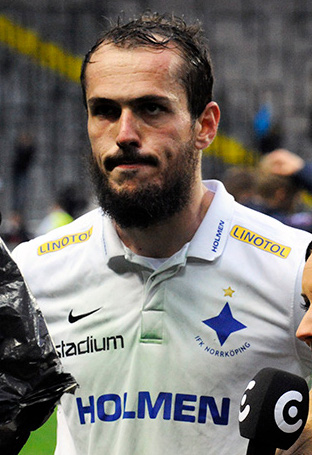
- Kujović with IFK Norrköping in 2015

Personal information
- Date of birth: 22 June 1988 (age 38)
- Place of birth: Bijelo Polje, SFR Yugoslavia
- Height: 1.94 m (6 ft 4 in)
- Position: Striker

Youth career
- Klippans BoIF
- Landskrona BoIS

Senior career*
Years	Team	Apps	(Gls)
2006	Landskrona BoIS	3	(0)
2007–2010	Halmstads BK	75	(14)
2007	→ Falkenbergs FF (loan)	24	(6)
2011–2013	Kayserispor	34	(12)
2013	→ Elazığspor (loan)	3	(0)
2013–2016	IFK Norrköping	59	(39)
2016–2017	Gent	1	(0)
2017–2019	Fortuna Düsseldorf	20	(2)
2019	→ Fortuna Düsseldorf II (loan)	1	(0)
2019–2021	Djurgårdens IF	48	(9)

International career^{‡}
2009–2010	Sweden U21	4	(0)
2016	Sweden	5	(1)
- * Club domestic league appearances and goals as of 4 December 2021 ‡ National team caps and goals as of 6 September 2016

Emir Kujović (Montenegrin: Емир Кујовић; born 22 June 1988) is a former professional footballer who played as a striker. Born in Montenegro, he won five caps and scored one goal for the Sweden national team, and was a squad player at UEFA Euro 2016.

In the summer of 2025 Kujović returned to Landskrona to coach their U-16 side after previously working in Djurgården’s academy.

== Club career ==
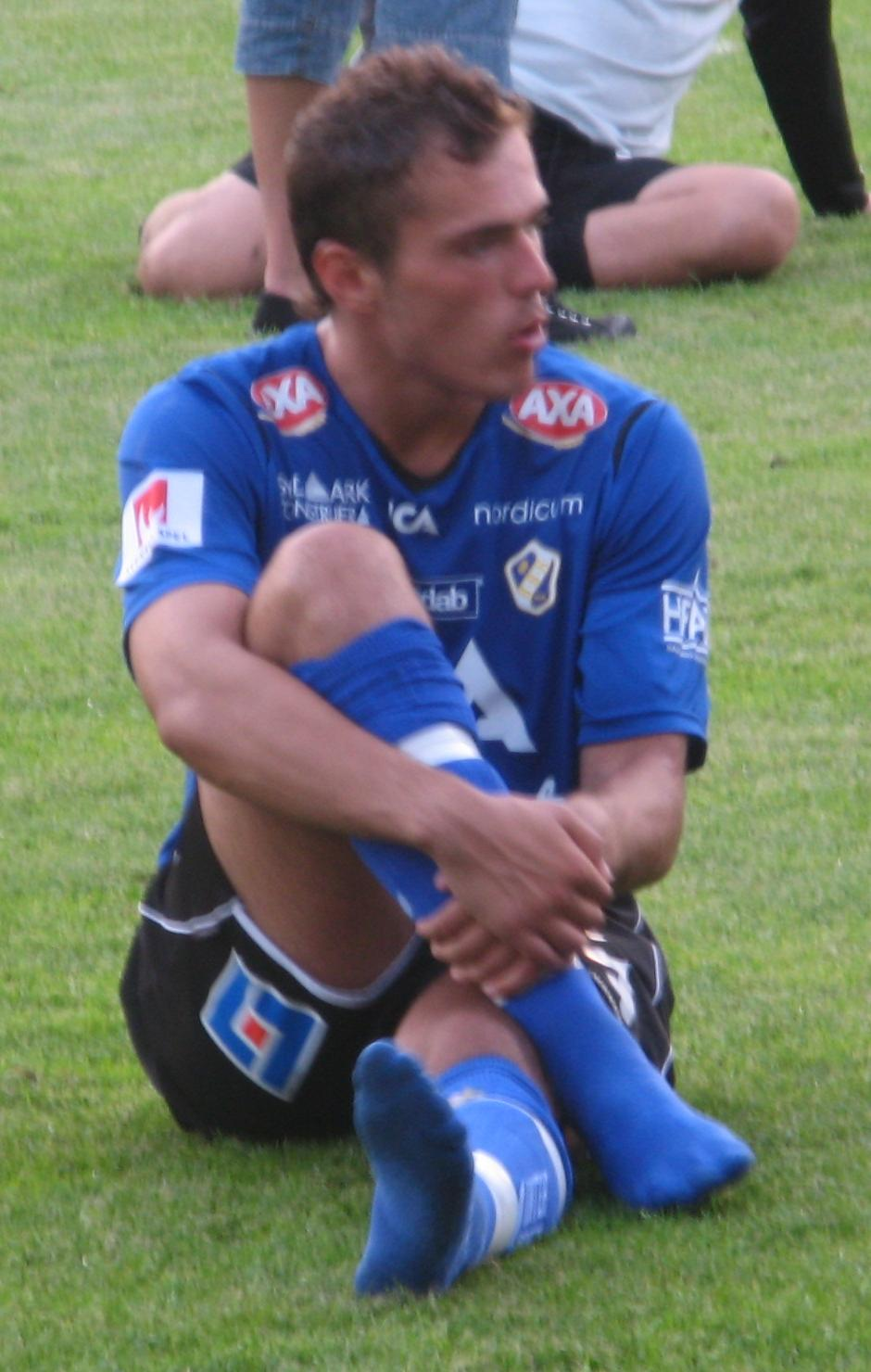
Kujovic in 2008 while at Halmstads BK.

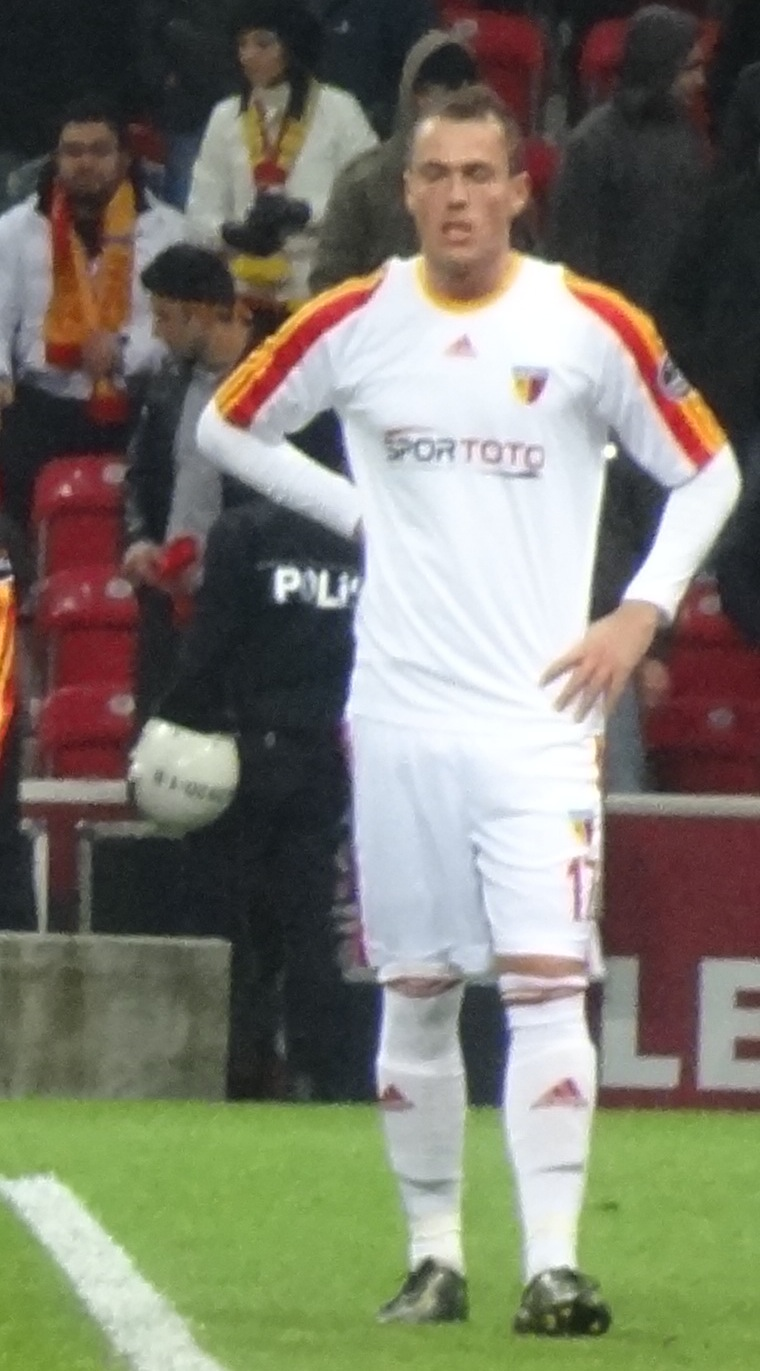
Kujovic playing for Kayserispor in 2011.

=== Halmstads BK ===
Kujović started his career in Superettan and Landskrona BoIS, in 2007 he joined Halmstads BK but was directly loaned out to Falkenbergs FF in Superettan for a year, in 2008 he returned to Halmstads BK and debuted in the first match of the season against Gefle IF (1-0) as a substitute.

While at Halmstads BK, he played with his older brother Ajsel Kujović, who represented the club between 2006 and 2009.

=== Kayserispor ===
Kujović was signed by Turkish club Kayserispor in October 2010 on a four-year deal starting in January 2011. On 5 January 2011, he scored his first goal for Kayserispor against Ankaragücü. In 2013, he also played, on loan, three games with the Elazığspor.

=== IFK Norrköping ===
On 9 August 2013, Kujović signed a 3.5-year contract with IFK Norrköping where he reunited with former Halmstads BK trainer Janne Andersson.

=== Djurgårdens IF ===
On 13 August 2019, he signed a 2.5-year contract with Djurgårdens IF.

== International career ==
Kujović debuted for Sweden under-21 team 27 March 2009 against Belgium. He was called up to the senior Sweden squad to face Denmark for the UEFA Euro 2016 play-off in November 2015. Emir Kujovic was a squad player for Sweden at Euro 2016. He has earned a total of 5 caps, scoring 1 goal. His final international was a September 2016 FIFA World Cup qualification match against the Netherlands.

== Personal life ==
Kujović is a practicing Muslim of Montenegrin Bosniak descent. He is the younger brother of Ajsel Kujović, who was a professional footballer.

== Career statistics ==
=== International ===
Appearances and goals by national team and year
National team	Year	Apps	Goals
Sweden	2016	5	1
Total		5	1

Scores and results list Sweden's goal tally first, score column indicates score after each Kujovic goal.

List of international goals scored by Emir Kujovic
No.	Date	Venue	Opponent	Score	Result	Competition	Ref.
1	10 January 2016	Armed Forces Stadium, Abu Dhabi, United Arab Emirates	Finland	3–0	3–0	Friendly	

== Honours ==
IFK Norrköping

- Allsvenskan: 2015
- Svenska Supercupen: 2015

Djurgårdens IF

- Allsvenskan: 2019

Individual

- Allsvenskan top scorer: 2015
