= Arnór Ingvi Traustason =

Icelandic footballer (born 1993)

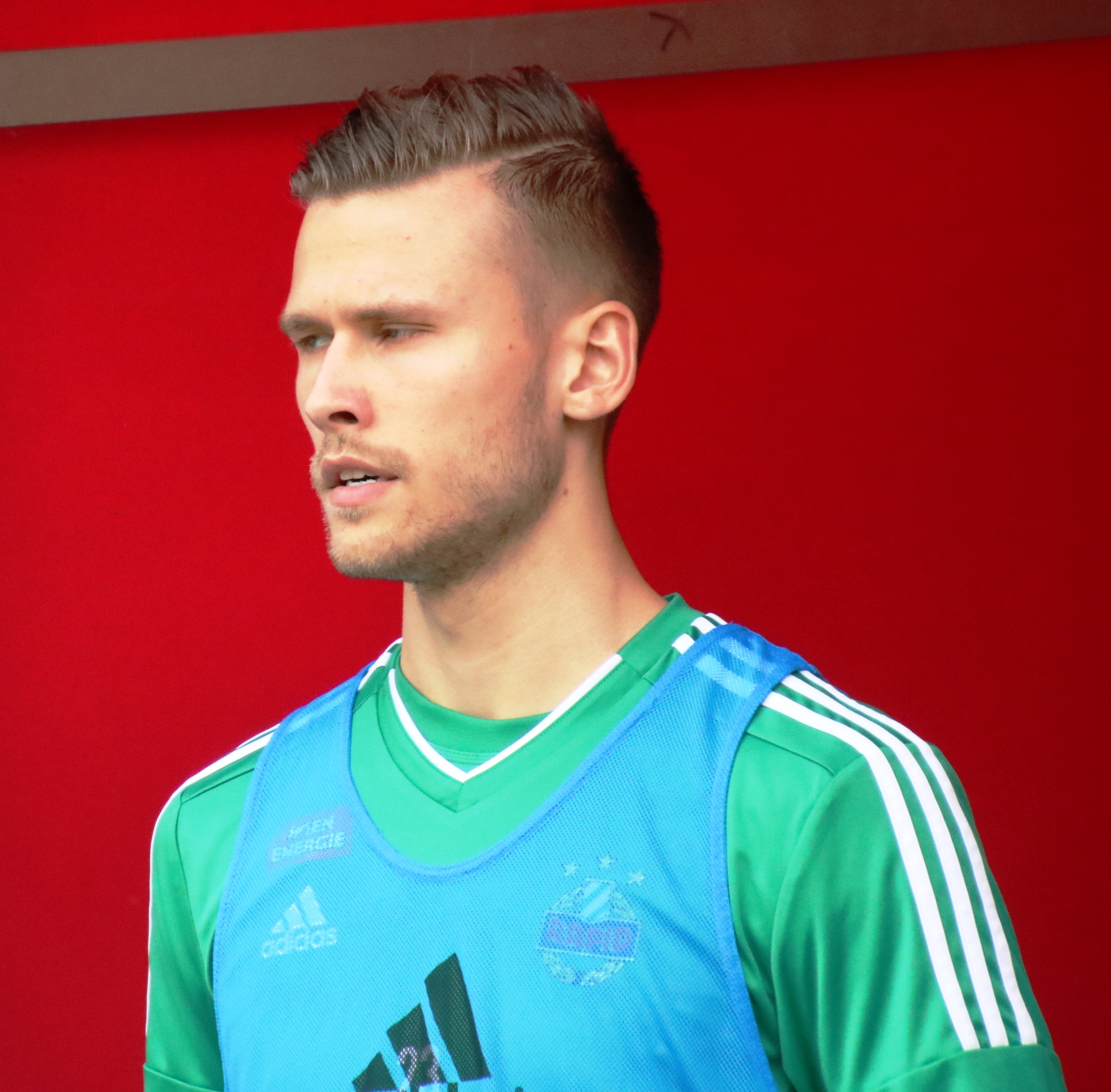
- Arnór with Rapid Wien in 2017

Personal information
- Full name: Arnór Ingvi Traustason
- Date of birth: 30 April 1993 (age 33)
- Place of birth: Keflavík, Iceland
- Height: 1.83 m (6 ft 0 in)
- Position: Midfielder

Team information
- Current team: KR Reykjavík
- Number: 23

Senior career*
Years	Team	Apps	(Gls)
2010–2013	Keflavík	52	(10)
2012	→ Sandnes Ulf (loan)	10	(0)
2014–2016	IFK Norrköping	56	(12)
2016–2017	Rapid Wien	22	(3)
2017	→ AEK Athens (loan)	3	(0)
2018–2020	Malmö FF	69	(12)
2021–2022	New England Revolution	39	(2)
2022–2025	IFK Norrköping	95	(23)
2026–	KR Reykjavík	24	(10)

International career^{‡}
2009	Iceland U17	2	(0)
2011	Iceland U19	5	(0)
2012–2014	Iceland U21	12	(1)
2015–	Iceland	67	(6)
- * Club domestic league appearances and goals as of 1 November 2026 ‡ National team caps and goals as of 11 June 2025

Arnór Ingvi Traustason (born 30 April 1993) is an Icelandic professional footballer who plays as a midfielder for Besta deild karla club KR Reykjavík and the Iceland national football team.

== Club career ==
While at Keflavik, Arnór Ingvi was named as the most promising player of the 2013 Úrvalsdeild after the season by his fellow Úrvalsdeild players.

Arnór Ingvi was signed to IFK Norrköping, and won the 2015 Swedish title with the club.

Arnór Ingvi signed with Rapid Wien in the summer of 2016.

On 5 July 2017, AEK Athens announced the signing of Arnór Ingvi on a one-year loan deal with a purchase option of €1 million for the summer of 2018. On 26 October 2017, he scored his first goal for the club in 7–0 away win against Apollon Larissa for the Greek Cup.

He was officially set for release from the club on 4 December 2017 as his performances and work rate did not live up to the expectations of experienced Spanish manager Manolo Jimenez. He made only five official performances with the club at the first part of 2017–18 season and signed a three-and-a-half-year contract with Swedish club Malmö FF for an undisclosed fee.

In March 2021 he signed for American MLS team New England Revolution. He scored his first two MLS goals in a 5–0 win over Inter Miami CF on 21 July. Arnór Ingvi and the Revolution mutually agreed to part ways on 10 August 2022.

In August 2022, Arnór Ingvi returned to IFK Norrköping on a long-term contract following his departure from Major League Soccer.

In December 2025, it was announced that Arnór Ingvi had signed with KR Reykjavík for the 2026 season.

== International career ==
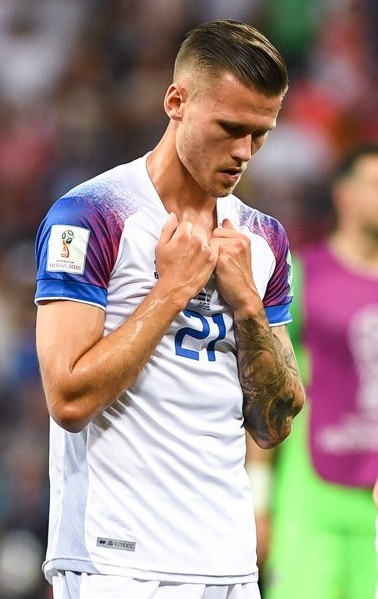
Iceland at the 2018 FIFA World Cup

Arnór Ingvi has represented Iceland at youth levels such as the under-17s, the under-19s and the under-21s.

He played for the under-21 side at the 2013 UEFA European Under-21 Football Championship qualification and the 2015 UEFA European Under-21 Football Championship qualification.

Arnór Ingvi made his senior debut for Iceland on 13 November 2015 in a 2–4 away defeat at the National Stadium against Poland. He was included in Heimir Hallgrímsson and Lars Lagerbäck's 23-man squad for the Euro 2016. On 22 June 2016, Arnór Ingvi scored the winning goal in a 2–1 victory over Austria as Iceland finished second in their Euro 2016 group, thus taking them to the Round of 16.

In May 2018 he was named in Iceland's 23 man-squad for the 2018 World Cup in Russia.

== Career statistics ==
=== International ===
As of match played 10 June 2025

Appearances and goals by national team and year
National team	Year	Apps	Goals
Iceland	2015	2	0
Iceland	2016	10	5
Iceland	2017	3	0
Iceland	2018	10	0
Iceland	2019	8	0
Iceland	2020	4	0
Iceland	2021	4	0
Iceland	2022	3	0
Iceland	2023	9	0
Iceland	2024	10	1
Iceland	2025	4	0
Total		67	6

As of match played 9 September 2024
Scores and results list Iceland's goal tally first, score column indicates score after each Arnór Ingvi goal.

List of international goals scored by Arnór Ingvi Traustason
No.	Date	Venue	Cap	Opponent	Score	Result	Competition
1	13 January 2016	Zayed Sports City Stadium, Abu Dhabi, United Arab Emirates	3	Finland	1–0	1–0	Friendly
2	24 March 2016	MCH Arena, Herning, Denmark	5	Denmark	1–2	1–2	Friendly
3	29 March 2016	Karaiskakis Stadium, Piraeus, Greece	6	Greece	1–2	3–2	Friendly
4	22 June 2016	Stade de France, Saint-Denis, France	8	Austria	2–1	2–1	UEFA Euro 2016
5	15 November 2016	Ta' Qali National Stadium, Malta, Malta	12	Malta	1–0	2–0	Friendly
6	21 March 2024	Szusza Ferenc Stadion, Budapest, Hungary	55	Israel	2–1	4–1	UEFA Euro 2024 qualifying play-offs

== Honours ==
IFK Norrköping

- Allsvenskan: 2015

Malmö FF

- Allsvenskan: 2020
