= Andreas Hadenius =

Swedish footballer (born 1991)

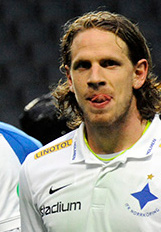

Personal information
- Full name: Andreas Fredrik Hadenius
- Date of birth: 18 March 1991 (age 35)
- Place of birth: Norrköping, Sweden
- Height: 1.88 m (6 ft 2 in)
- Position: Centre back

Youth career
- Smedby AIS

Senior career*
Years	Team	Apps	(Gls)
2009–2010	IFK Norrköping	0	(0)
2010	→ IF Sylvia (loan)	24	(0)
2011	IF Sylvia	26	(0)
2012	IFK Värnamo	16	(0)
2013	IF Sylvia	25	(2)
2014–2017	IFK Norrköping	47	(1)
2018–2021	Halmstads BK	13	(1)
2019	→ Dundee (loan)	3	(0)
2020	→ IF Sylvia (loan)	26	(1)
2021–2022	IF Sylvia	33	(0)
Total		213	(5)

International career
2006	Sweden U17	1	(0)
- * Club domestic league appearances and goals as of 17:00, 22 October 2022 (UTC)

Andreas Hadenius (born 18 March 1991) is a Swedish former footballer who played as a defender. He is currently a youth coach for the SvFF in his hometown of Norrköping.

Hadenius signed on loan for Scottish Premiership club Dundee in January 2019.
