= Gentrit Citaku =

Swedish footballer of Albanian descent

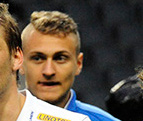

Personal information
- Full name: Gentrit Citaku
- Date of birth: 25 February 1996 (age 30)
- Place of birth: Norrköping, Sweden
- Height: 1.85 m (6 ft 1 in)
- Position: Midfielder

Team information
- Current team: IK Sleipner
- Number: 11

Youth career
- Hageby IF
- –2008: IF Sylvia
- 2009–2013: IFK Norrköping

Senior career*
Years	Team	Apps	(Gls)
2013–2017	IFK Norrköping	12	(0)
2014	→ IF Sylvia (loan)	8	(0)
2016	→ IFK Värnamo (loan)	9	(2)
2017	→ IFK Värnamo (loan)	13	(0)
2018	Smedby AIS	8	(0)
2019	Assyriska	21	(4)
2020	IK Sleipner	7	(1)
2021	IK Sleipner	12	(16)

International career
2011–2013	Sweden U17	22	(5)
2013–2015	Sweden U19	5	(0)
- * Club domestic league appearances and goals as of 4 September 2021

Gentrit Citaku (born 25 February 1996) is a Swedish footballer who plays as a midfielder for IK Sleipner.

He was born and raised in Navestad which is an area in Norrköping, Sweden.

== Career ==
Citaku made his Allsvenskan debut on 1 September 2013 in a game against Syrianska FC where he came on as an 82nd minute sub.

He currently plays for IK Sleipner in Norrköping, Sweden, as a midfielder after formally joining from Assyriska 2020.

== International career ==
Citaku has represented both the Sweden men's national under-17 football team and Sweden men's national under-19 football team on several occasions. In September 2013 he was selected to be part of Sweden's squad for the 2013 FIFA U-17 World Cup. Even though he is representing Sweden at the youth level Citaku has said that he is open to playing for the Albania national football team in the future.

== Honours ==
Sweden U17

- FIFA U-17 World Cup Third place: 2013
