= Sebastian Andersson =

Swedish footballer (born 1991)

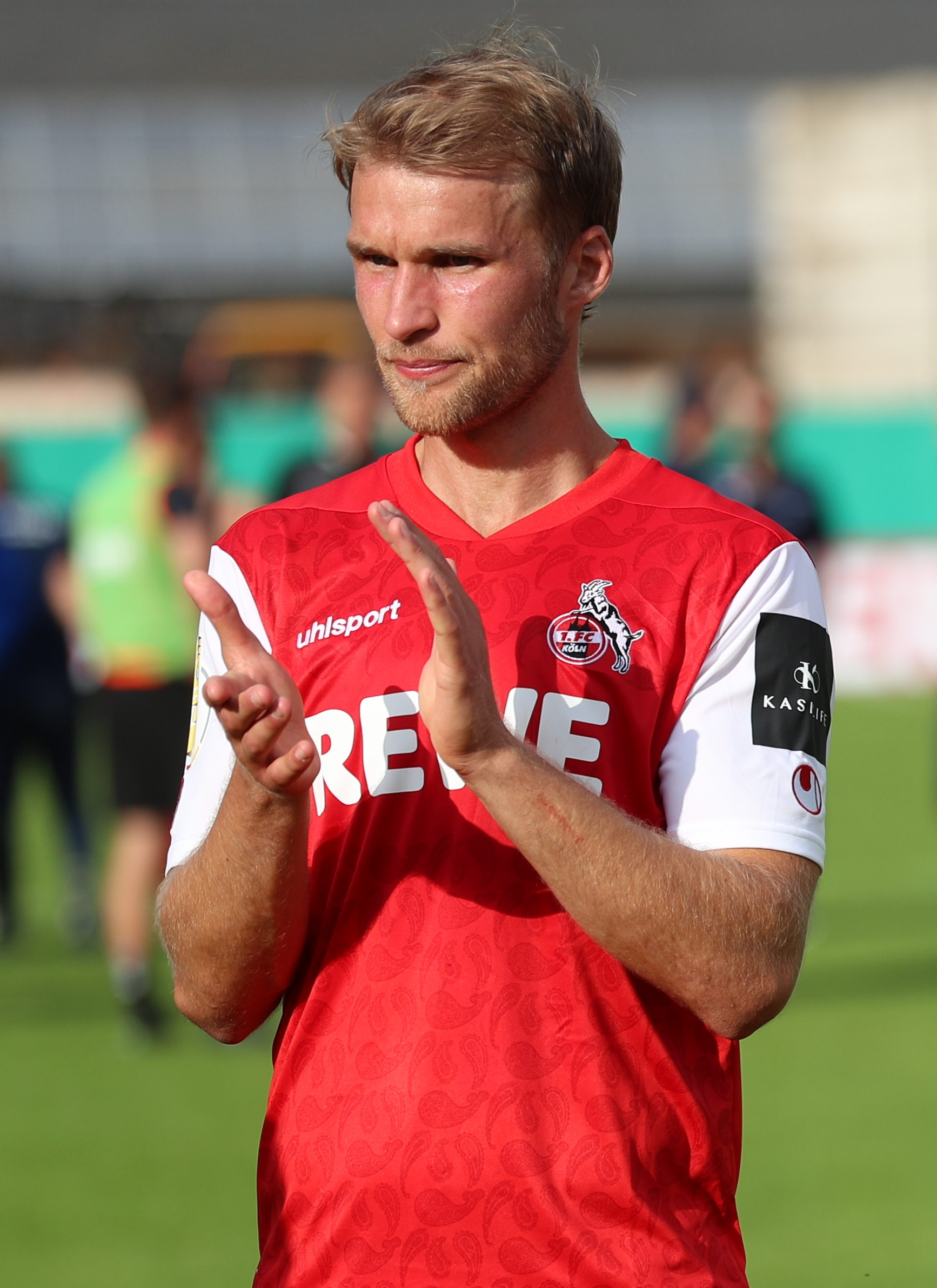
- Andersson with 1. FC Köln in 2021

Personal information
- Full name: Martin Sebastian Andersson
- Date of birth: 15 July 1991 (age 35)
- Place of birth: Ängelholm, Sweden
- Height: 1.90 m (6 ft 3 in)
- Position: Striker

Youth career
- 1996–2006: Ängelholms FF
- 1998–2006: Vinslövs IF
- 2006–2007: Helsingborgs IF
- 2008–2009: Ängelholms FF

Senior career*
Years	Team	Apps	(Gls)
2010–2011	Ängelholms FF	50	(17)
2012–2014	Kalmar FF	52	(3)
2014–2016	Djurgårdens IF	35	(13)
2016–2017	IFK Norrköping	51	(20)
2017–2018	1. FC Kaiserslautern	29	(12)
2018–2020	Union Berlin	67	(24)
2020–2023	1. FC Köln	42	(6)
2023	1. FC Köln II	1	(0)
2024	1. FC Nürnberg	15	(2)
Total		342	(97)

International career
2011	Sweden U21	1	(0)
2017–2019	Sweden	9	(3)
- * Club domestic league appearances and goals

Martin Sebastian Andersson (born 15 July 1991) is a Swedish former professional footballer who played as a striker.

== Club career ==
=== Early career ===
Andersson started out playing youth football for his hometown club Ängelholms FF when he was five. A couple of years later he also simultaneously started playing for Vinslövs IF. This was because his parents had separated and he was living every other week in different locations with each parent so he also had to switch between the two clubs every other week. When he turned 15 he joined the youth team of Helsingborgs IF but only a couple of years later the club discontinued the age group that he was playing for and as he wasn't given a first team contract he had to leave.

He then went back to Ängelholm where he, as a seventeen-year-old, was put straight into the club's U21 team. After making his first-team debut in 2010, Andersson's first highly successful season was the 2011 Superettan, in which he was one of the top ten goalscorers in the second tier of the Swedish football league system. Due to his success he was signed by Allsvenskan club Kalmar FF after the season.

On 1 August 2014, Andersson joined Djurgården. He made 39 competitive appearances and scored 16 goals for the Stockholm team before being sold to IFK Norrköping in 2016.

=== FC Kaiserslautern ===
On 31 August 2017, the last day of the 2017 summer transfer window, Andersson signed a three-year contract with 2. Bundesliga side 1. FC Kaiserslautern.

=== Union Berlin ===
In June 2018, following Kaiserslautern's relegation, 1. FC Union Berlin announced Andersson would join the club on a free transfer for the 2018–19 season having agreed a two-year contract.

=== FC Köln ===
On 15 September 2020, Andersson moved to Bundesliga club 1. FC Köln and signed a contract until 2023. The transfer fee paid to Union Berlin was reported as €6 million. On 19 September 2020, Andersson scored on his Bundesliga debut for FC Köln in a 2–3 loss to Hoffenheim.

=== 1. FC Nürnberg ===
In January 2024, Andersson joined 2. Bundesliga club 1. FC Nürnberg on a short-term contract until the end of the season having impressed on trial.

== International career ==
Andersson made his only appearance for the national under-21 team on 15 November 2011 in a game against Malta. He made his senior debut in January 2017 in a friendly game against the Ivory Coast. He scored his first two goals for Sweden four days later, in a 6–0 thrashing of Slovakia.

Andersson scored his first competitive international goal in a UEFA Euro 2020 qualifying game against the Faroe Islands which Sweden won 3–0.

== Career statistics ==
=== Club ===
As of match played 20 March 2022

Appearances and goals by club, season and competition
Club	Season	League			Cup		Continental		Other		Total	
Club	Season	Division	Apps	Goals	Apps	Goals	Apps	Goals	Apps	Goals	Apps	Goals
Ängelholms FF	2010	Superettan	22	5	1	0	—		—		23	5
Ängelholms FF	2011	Superettan	28	12	1	1	—		2 (Note: Appearances in Allsvenskan relegation play-offs)	2	31	15
Ängelholms FF	Total		50	17	2	1	—		2	2	54	20
Kalmar FF	2012	Allsvenskan	25	1	1	2	6	1	—		32	4
Kalmar FF	2013	Allsvenskan	15	0	3	2	—		—		18	2
Kalmar FF	2014	Allsvenskan	12	2	—		—		—		12	2
Kalmar FF	Total		52	3	4	4	6	1	—		62	8
Djurgårdens IF	2014	Allsvenskan	13	6	1	1	—		—		14	7
Djurgårdens IF	2015	Allsvenskan	22	7	1	2	—		—		23	9
Djurgårdens IF	2016	Allsvenskan	—		3	2	—		—		3	2
Djurgårdens IF	Total		35	13	5	5	—		—		40	18
IFK Norrköping	2016	Allsvenskan	30	14	1	0	2	3	—		33	17
IFK Norrköping	2017	Allsvenskan	21	6	6	2	4	3	—		31	11
IFK Norrköping	Total		51	20	7	2	6	6	—		64	28
1. FC Kaiserslautern	2017–18	2. Bundesliga	29	12	1	0	—		—		30	12
Union Berlin	2018–19	2. Bundesliga	34	12	2	1	—		2 (Note: Appearances in Bundesliga relegation play-offs)	0	38	13
Union Berlin	2019–20	Bundesliga	33	12	3	1	—		—		36	13
Union Berlin	Total		67	24	5	2	—		2	0	74	26
1. FC Köln	2020–21	Bundesliga	16	3	0	0	—		2	2	18	5
1. FC Köln	2021–22	Bundesliga	25	3	3	0	—		—		28	3
1. FC Köln	Total		41	6	3	0	—		2	2	46	8
Career total			325	95	27	14	12	7	6	4	370	120

=== International ===
As of match played 18 November 2019.

Appearances and goals by national team and year
National team	Year	Apps	Goals
Sweden	2017	2	2
Sweden	2018	2	0
Sweden	2019	5	1
Total		9	3

International goals

Scores and results list Sweden's goal tally first.

No.	Date	Venue	Opponent	Score	Result	Competition
1.	12 January 2017	Zayed Sports City Stadium, Abu Dhabi, United Arab Emirates	Slovakia	3–0	6–0	Friendly
2.	12 January 2017	Zayed Sports City Stadium, Abu Dhabi, United Arab Emirates	Slovakia	4–0	6–0	Friendly
3.	18 November 2019	Friends Arena, Solna, Sweden	Faroe Islands	1–0	3–0	UEFA Euro 2020 qualification
