= Idrottsparken (Norrköping) =

Sports ground in Norrköping, Sweden

Coordinates: 58°35′4″N 16°10′23″E

- Parken
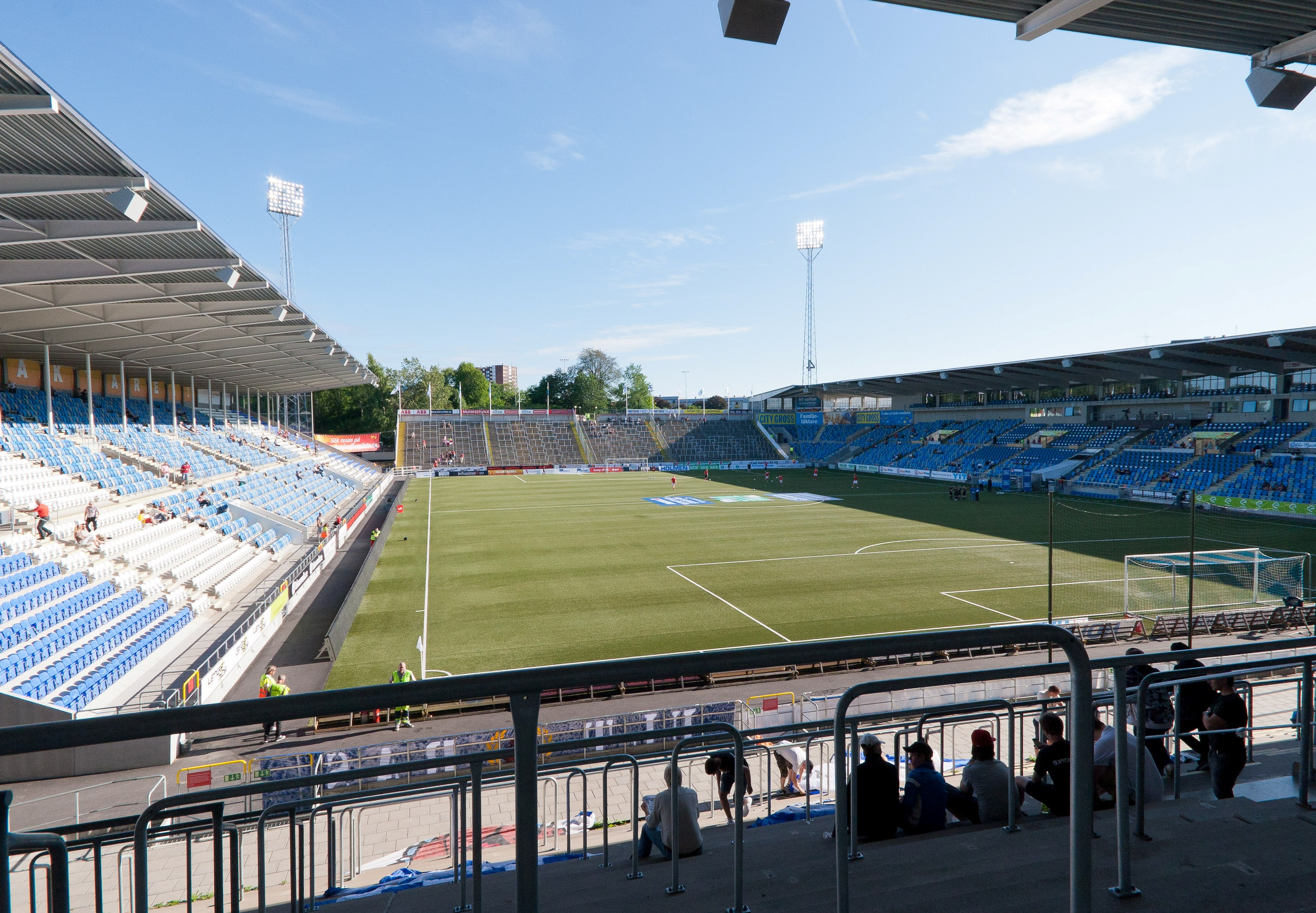
- Idrottsparken
- Interactive map of Idrottsparken
- Full name: Idrottsparken
- Owner: IFK Norrköping via Parken Event Arena AB
- Operator: IFK Norrköping
- Capacity: 16,000
- Surface: Artificial Grass
- Field size: 105 x 68 m

Construction
- Groundbreaking: 24 April 1903
- Built: 1903
- Opened: 25 September 1903
- Renovated: 1958, 1991, 2009

Tenants
- IK Sleipner; IF Sylvia; IFK Norrköping

Idrottsparken, formerly known as Nya Parken, Östgötaporten and PlatinumCars Arena, is a multi-purpose stadium in Norrköping, Sweden. It opened on 25 September 1903 and is currently used mostly for football matches. It is the home arena for IFK Norrköping, IK Sleipner and for IF Sylvia. The stadium had a capacity of 19,414 people until 2008–09 when the arena was re-built.

Construction began on 27 April 1903, and inauguration occurred on 25 September the same year, during the Norrköping Sports Association's Sport Festival. During the 1958 FIFA World Cup, it hosted some group stage matches. During the Euro 1992, it hosted CIS – Germany (1–1), Scotland – Germany (0–2) and Scotland – CIS (3–0), all in Group B.

In 2008–2009 the arena was rebuilt. The arena now uses Artificial grass and the capacity has decreased from 19,414 to around 16,000 spectators. The new arena hosts 16 VIP booths, VIP seating for 515 spectators, three bars, two restaurants and small indoor training arena called "Teknikhallen". IFK Norrköping took over the ownership of the arena in 2010 from the city council of Norrköping in a 308.5 million SEK purchase. From its opening in 1903 until its renovation in 2009, the arena had been known as Norrköpings Idrottspark, but after the renovation the name was changed to Nya Parken.

In 2016, the arena changed name for the third time in its history. This time to Östgötaporten, after the naming rights was sold to a real estate company.

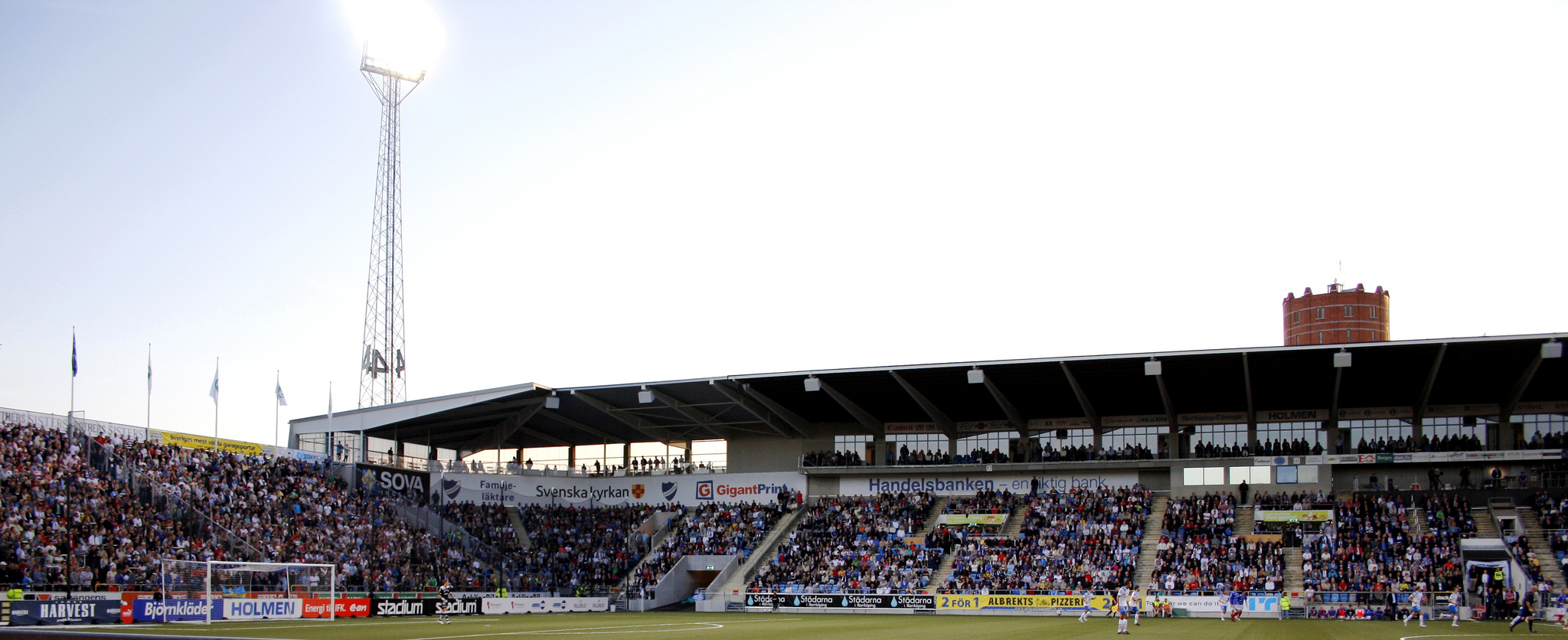
