= 2016 Östersunds FK season =

Östersund
2016 season
- Chairman: Daniel Kindberg
- Manager: Graham Potter
- Stadium: Jämtkraft Arena
- Allsvenskan: 8th
- Svenska Cupen: 3rd in Group 1
- Top goalscorer: League: Saman Ghoddos (10 goals); All: Saman Ghoddos (12 goals)
- Highest home attendance: 8,208 (6 August 2016 vs Sundsvall, Allsvenskan)
- Lowest home attendance: 671 (6 March 2016 vs AFC United, Svenska Cupen)
- Average home league attendance: 5,590 (in Allsvenskan); 4,770 (in all competitions)

The 2016 season was Östersund's 1st season in the top flight of Swedish football and 19th year in existence as a football club. They entered the season as a newly promoted side after finishing second in the 2015 Superettan, and participated in Svenska Cupen.

== Club ==
=== Coaching staff ===
Position	Staff
Director of Football	(Sweden) Daniel Kindberg
Head coach	(England) Graham Potter
Assistant coach	(Scotland) Billy Reid
Assistant coach	(Sweden) Björn Hamberg
Goalkeeper coach	(Sweden) Linus Eriksson
Senior Opposition Scout	(Scotland) Kyle Macaulay
Physiotherapist	(Sweden) Frida Eklund
Physiotherapist	(Sweden) Jenny Larsson
Pilates Instructor	(England) Rachel Potter
International Head Coach	(Sweden) Bengt Olsson

Source: Östersunds FK

== Squad information ==
=== First-team squad ===
As of 25 July 2016.

Squad No.	Name	Nationality	Position(s)	Date of birth (age)
Goalkeepers
1	Aly Keita	(Sweden)	GK	8 December 1986 (age 39)
77	Haraldur Björnsson	(Iceland)	GK	11 January 1989 (age 37)
16	Hampus Nilsson	(Sweden)	GK	17 July 1990 (age 36)
Defenders
5	Walid Atta	(Ethiopia)	CB / RB	28 August 1986 (age 40)
6	Doug Bergqvist	(Sweden)	CB	29 March 1993 (age 33)
14	Bobo Sollander	(Sweden)	CB	5 June 1985 (age 41)
19	Dennis Widgren	(Sweden)	LB	28 March 1994 (age 32)
24	Ronald Mukiibi	(Sweden)	CB	16 September 1991 (age 35)
25	Samuel Mensah	(Ghana)	CB / RB	19 May 1989 (age 37)
31	Sotirios Papagiannopoulos	(Sweden)	CB	5 September 1990 (age 36)
39	Stefan Karlsson	(Sweden)	CB	15 December 1988 (age 37)
Midfielders
4	Sebastian Lundbäck	(Sweden)	CM	27 May 1996 (age 30)
7	Monday Samuel	(Nigeria)	LM	12 November 1993 (age 32)
8	Jamie Hopcutt	(England)	AM	23 June 1992 (age 34)
10	Hosam Aiesh	(Sweden)	RM	14 April 1995 (age 31)
12	Ken Sema	(Sweden)	RM	30 September 1993 (age 33)
17	Curtis Edwards	(England)	CM	12 January 1994 (age 32)
20	Gabriel Somi	(Sweden)	LM	24 August 1991 (age 35)
21	Fouad Bachirou	(Comoros)	DM	15 April 1990 (age 36)
22	Brwa Nouri	(Iraq)	DM	23 January 1987 (age 39)
23	Alex Dyer	(Montserrat)	DM	1 June 1990 (age 36)
27	Piotr Johansson	(Sweden)	RW	28 February 1995 (age 31)
Strikers
11	Andrew Stadler	(United States)	CF	1 May 1988 (age 38)
18	Alhaji Gero	(Nigeria)	CF	10 October 1993 (age 33)
93	Saman Ghoddos	(Sweden)	CF	3 November 1993 (age 33)

== Transfers ==
=== In ===
==== Winter ====
No.	Pos	Player	Transferred from	Fee	Date	Source
93	ST	(Sweden) Saman Ghoddos	(Sweden) Syrianska	£56,000	1 January 2016	
25	CB	(Ghana) Samuel Mensah	(Sweden) Örebro	Free	1 January 2016	
20	LM	(Sweden) Gabriel Somi	(Sweden) Syrianska	Free	1 January 2016	
24	CB	(Sweden) Ronald Mukiibi	(Sweden) BK Häcken	Undisclosed	1 January 2016	
12	RM	(Sweden) Ken Sema	(Sweden) Ljungskile	Undisclosed	5 January 2016	
18	ST	(Nigeria) Alhaji Gero	(Denmark) Viborg	Free	18 January 2016	
5	CB	(Ethiopia) Walid Atta	(Turkey) Gençlerbirliği	Free	23 February 2016	
17	CM	(England) Curtis Edwards	(Sweden) Ytterhogdals IK	Undisclosed	23 July 2016	
39	CM	(Sweden) Stefan Karlsson	(Sweden) Djurgårdens IF	Undisclosed	24 July 2016	

=== Out ===
==== Winter ====
No.	Pos	Player	Transferred to	Fee	Date	Source
—	RM	(South Korea) Moon Seon-min	(Sweden) Djurgården	Undisclosed	1 January 2016	
—	RB	(England) James Sinclair	(Sweden) GAIS	Free	1 January 2016	
—	CB	(Slovakia) Tomáš Peciar	(Slovakia) FK Poprad	Free	1 January 2016	
—	LB	(Sweden) Jonathan Azulay	(Sweden) Degerfors	Free	1 January 2016	
—	ST	(Bosnia and Herzegovina) Dragan Kapcevic	(Sweden) IK Sirius	Free	1 January 2016	
—	LB	(Kosovo) Kujtim Bala	(Sweden) IK Sirius	Free	1 January 2016	
—	AM	(Sweden) Linus Sjöberg	(Sweden) Västerås SK	Free	10 February 2016	
—	ST	(England) Taylor Morgan	(United States) Tulsa Roughnecks	Free	23 February 2016	
—	CB	(Sweden) Robert Hammarstedt	(Sweden) Piteå IF	Free	3 March 2016	
—	ST	(Sweden) Grace Tanda	(Sweden) Skellefteå	Free	17 March 2016	
9	ST	(Sweden) Emir Smajic	Unattached	Free	1 July 2016	
29	ST	(Nigeria) Michael Omoh	(Sweden) Örebro SK	Undisclosed	15 July 2016	
77	GK	(Iceland) Haraldur Björnsson	(Norway) Lillestrøm SK	Undisclosed	16 August 2016	

=== Loan in ===
==== Winter ====
No.	Pos	Player	Loaned From	Start	End	Source
27	GK	(England) Jamal Blackman	(England) Chelsea	18 March 2016	31 May 2016	
27	RW	(Sweden) Piotr Johansson	(Sweden) Malmö FF	15 July 2016	1 December 2016	
16	GK	(Sweden) Hampus Nilsson	(Sweden) Djurgårdens IF	11 August 2016	1 December 2016	

=== Loan out ===
==== Winter ====
No.	Pos	Player	Loaned To	Start	End	Source
10	RM	(Sweden) Hosam Aiesh	(Sweden) Varbergs BoIS	31 March 2016	22 June 2016	

=== Overall transfer activity ===
==== Spending ====
Winter: ▼£56,000

Summer: ▼£0

Total: ▼£56,000

==== Income ====
Winter: ▲£0

Summer: ▲£0

Total: ▲£0

==== Expenditure ====
Winter: ▼£56,000

Summer: ▲£0

Total: ▼£56,000

== Friendlies ==
23 January 2016	Levanger FK	2–3	Östersund	Trondheim, Norway
	Sondre Aas; Stokke	Report	Sema; Gero; Fretwell	Stadium: Abrahallen (indoors)

4 February 2016	UE Cornellà	2–3	Östersund	Barcelona, Spain
	Enrique 47'; Fran 80' (pen.)	Report	Ghoddos 15'; Nouri 37' (pen.); Smajic 54'

13 February 2016	Östersund	1–1	Ranheim	Östersund, Sweden
14:00 GMT	Ghoddos 41'	Report	Kvande 37'	Stadium: Jämtkraft Arena; Attendance: 528

19 March 2016	GIF Sundsvall	1–2	Östersund	Sundsvall, Sweden
15:00 GMT	Danielsson 45'	Report	Dyer 14'; Ghoddos 28'	Stadium: Norrporten Arena

23 March 2016	Everton	2–1	Östersund	Liverpool, England
13:00 GMT	Mirallas 40'; Barry 84'	Report	Mukiibi 36'	Stadium: Finch Farm

26 March 2016	Östersund	0–0	Dalkurd FF	Östersund, Sweden
13:00 GMT		Report		Stadium: Jämtkraft Arena; Attendance: 432

26 June 2016	Östersund	1–1	Rosenborg BK	Östersund, Sweden
	Stadler 83'	Report	Helland 38'	Stadium: Jämtkraft Arena; Attendance: 3,648

28 June 2016	Östersund	0–1	Djurgårdens IF	Östersund, Sweden
		Report	Walker 61' (pen.)	Stadium: Jämtkraft Arena

2 July 2016	Östersund	3–0	GIF Sundsvall	Östersund, Sweden
	Stadler; Gero	Report		Stadium: Jämtkraft Arena

== Competitions ==
=== Overview ===
Competition	Record							
Competition	G	W	D	L	GF	GA	GD	Win %
Allsvenskan	20	8	5	7	26	31	−5	40.00
Svenska Cupen	3	1	0	2	3	5	−2	33.33
Total	23	9	5	9	29	36	−7	39.13

Updated to match played 31 August 2016
Source: Competitions

=== Allsvenskan ===
==== League table ====
Pos	Team	Pld	W	D	L	GF	GA	GD	Pts	Qualification or relegation
6	Kalmar FF	30	12	8	10	45	40	+5	44	
7	Djurgårdens IF	30	14	1	15	48	47	+1	43	
8	Östersunds FK	30	12	6	12	44	46	−2	42	Qualification for the Europa League second qualifying round (Note: Östersunds FK qualified for the Europa League second qualifying round by winning the 2016–17 Svenska Cupen.)
9	Örebro SK	30	11	8	11	48	51	−3	41	
10	BK Häcken	30	11	7	12	58	45	+13	40	

Source: svenskfotboll.se (in Swedish)
Rules for classification: 1) Points; 2) Goal difference; 3) Goals scored; 4) Head-to-head points; 5) Head-to-head goal difference; 6) Head-to-head away goals scored; 7) Play-off
(Note: Play-off is only played if need to decide champion, teams for relegation or UEFA competition and will be played on a neutral ground).

==== Results summary ====
Overall								Home						Away					
Pld	W	D	L	GF	GA	GD	Pts	W	D	L	GF	GA	GD	W	D	L	GF	GA	GD
20	8	5	7	26	31	−5	29	6	1	3	14	11	+3	2	4	4	12	20	−8

Last updated: 31 August 2016.
Source: Allsvenskan

==== Results by matchday ====
Matchday	1	2	3	4	5	6	7	8	9	10	11	12	13	14	15	16	17	18	19	20	21	22	23	24	25	26	27	28	29	30
Ground	A	H	A	H	A	H	A	H	H	A	A	H	H	A	A	H	H	A	H	A	H	A	H	A	H	A	A	H	A	H
Result	D	L	W	W	D	L	L	W	W	D	L	L	W	D	L	D	W	D (Note: Game declared a 1–1 draw, having been originally given a win for Östersund.)	W	L	W	L	L	L	W	L	W	W	W	L
Position	8	13	10	7	10	11	13	11	6	7	10	13	8	9	9	9	8	8	8	8	8	8	9	11	11	11	10	8	7	8

Updated to match(es) played on 31 August 2016. Source: Statto
A = Away; H = Home; W = Win; D = Draw; L = Loss

==== Score overview ====
Win Draw Loss

Opposition	Home score	Away score	Double
AIK	0–2	0–2	No
Djurgården	1–0	0–3	No
Elfsborg	0–0	1–3	No
Falkenberg	6–1	2–1	Yes
Gefle	2–4	0–0	No
Göteborg	2–0	0–2	No
Häcken	2–1	1–3	No
Hammarby	2–0	1–1	No
Helsingborg	2–0	1–1	No
Jönköping	1–0	1–1 (Note: Game abandoned, declared a 1-1 draw, as it stood.)	No
Kalmar	1–0	0–2	No
Malmö	1–4	3–0	No
Norrköping	0–2	3–3	No
Örebro	2–4	5–1	No
Sundsvall	4–0	0–5	No

==== Matches ====
Win Draw Loss Upcoming fixture

4 April 2016 1	Hammarby	1–1	Östersund	Stockholm
18:00 GMT	Batan (yellow card) 11'; Sætra 14'; Hallberg (yellow card) 16'; Alex (yellow card) 58'; Rômulo (yellow card) 76'	Report	Ghoddos 35'; Papagiannopoulos (yellow card) 42'; Somi (yellow card) 56'; Dyer (yellow card) 62'	Stadium: Tele2 Arena; Attendance: 31,756; Referee: Bojan Pandžić

7 April 2016 2	Östersund	0–2	AIK	Östersund
18:00 GMT	Papagiannopoulos (yellow card) 59'	Report	Johansson (yellow card) 35'; Strandberg 36'; Hooiveld (yellow card) 40'; Isak (yellow card) 40' (goal) 50'; Karlsson (yellow card) 77'	Stadium: Jämtkraft Arena; Attendance: 7,371; Referee: Glenn Nyberg

10 April 2016 3	Falkenberg	1–2	Östersund	Falkenberg
16:30 GMT	Svensson (yellow card) 45+1'; Jakobsen 67'; Juel-Nielsen (yellow card) 69'; Nilsson (yellow card) 90+2'	Report	Smajic 37'; Stadler 40'	Stadium: Falkenbergs IP; Attendance: 2,456; Referee: Mohammed Al Hakim

15 April 2016 4	Östersund	2–1	Häcken	Östersund
18:00 GMT	Mukiibi 5'; Nouri 76' (pen.)	Report	Sandberg 13'; Abubakari (yellow card) 60'	Stadium: Jämtkraft Arena; Attendance: 4,524; Referee: Jonas Eriksson

23 April 2016 5	Gefle	0–0	Östersund	Gävle
15:00 GMT	Rauschenberg (yellow card) 28'; Skrabb (yellow card) 44'	Report		Stadium: Strömvallen; Attendance: 3,078; Referee: Kaspar Sjöberg

27 April 2016 6	Östersund	2–4	Örebro	Östersund
17:30 GMT	Atta 39' 69'; Somi (yellow card) 86'; Ghoddos (yellow card) 87'	Report	Holmberg 41' 58'; Gustavsson 51' 60'	Stadium: Jämtkraft Arena; Attendance: 4,099; Referee: Patrik Eriksson

2 May 2016 7	Djurgården	3–0	Östersund	Stockholm
18:00 GMT	Moon Seon-min 17'; Johnson 18'; Björkström (yellow card) 30'; Faltsetas (yellow card) 49'; Ranégie (yellow card) 63' (goal) 69'	Report	Nouri (yellow card) 52'	Stadium: Tele2 Arena; Attendance: 11,275; Referee: Markus Strömbergsson

7 May 2016 8	Östersund	1–0	Kalmar	Östersund
15:00 GMT	Mukiibi 7'	Report	Romário (yellow card) 48'	Stadium: Jämtkraft Arena; Attendance: 4,797; Referee: Glenn Nyberg

15 May 2016 9	Östersund	2–0	Göteborg	Östersund
16:30 GMT	Nouri (yellow card) 52'; Mukiibi 65'; Ghoddos 71'	Report	Aleesami (yellow card) 60' (red card) 81'; Hermannsson (yellow card) 74'	Stadium: Jämtkraft Arena; Attendance: 7,159; Referee: Andreas Ekberg

18 May 2016 10	Helsingborg	1–1	Östersund	Helsingborg
17:30 GMT	Andersson (yellow card) 71'; Rusike (yellow card) 77'; Wede 81'; Larsson (yellow card) 83'	Report	Stadler 20'; Gero (yellow card) 85'; Papagiannopoulos (yellow card) 90+5'	Stadium: Olympia (Helsingborg); Attendance: 8,262; Referee: Johan Hamlin

21 May 2016 11	Sundsvall	5–0	Östersund	Sundsvall
15:00 GMT	Dibba 32'; Sigurjónsson 56' 87'; Sonko Sundberg 62'; Silva 65'; Eklund (yellow card) 90+1'	Report	Dyer (yellow card) 89'	Stadium: Norrporten Arena; Attendance: 7,462; Referee: Markus Strömbergsson

28 May 2016 12	Östersund	1–4	Malmö	Östersund
15:00 GMT	Dyer 63'	Report	Rosenberg 3'; Kjartansson 6' 65' 90+4'; Christiansen (yellow card) 73'	Stadium: Jämtkraft Arena; Attendance: 7,739; Referee: Johan Krantz

10 July 2016 13	Östersund	1–0	Jönköping	Östersund
14:00 GMT	Dyer 50'	Report	Calisir (yellow card) 49'	Stadium: Jämtkraft Arena; Attendance: 4,694; Referee: Johan Hamlin

16 July 2016 14	Norrköping	3–3	Östersund	Norrköping
15:00 GMT	Bärkroth 12'; Nyman 23' (yellow card) 90+2'; Fjóluson (yellow card) 56'; Andersson 75'	Report	Nouri 6' (pen.); Papagiannopoulos (yellow card) 51'; Ghoddos 53' 84'	Stadium: Nya Parken; Attendance: 7,421; Referee: Mohammed Al Hakim

25 July 2016 15	Elfsborg	3–1	Östersund	Borås
18:00 GMT	Jönsson (yellow card) 29'; Prodell 36'; Claesson 63' 69'; Randrup (yellow card) 72'; Frick (yellow card) 90'	Report	Dyer 54'; Bergqvist (yellow card) 90'	Stadium: Borås Arena; Attendance: 6,759; Referee: Robert Daradic

30 July 2016 16	Östersund	0–0	Elfsborg	Östersund
15:00 GMT	Dyer (yellow card) 48'; Bergqvist (yellow card) 75'; Bachirou (yellow card) 90'	Report	Claesson (yellow card) 90+1'; Rosenqvist (yellow card) 90+3'	Stadium: Jämtkraft Arena; Attendance: 5,217; Referee: Bojan Pandžić

6 August 2016 17	Östersund	4–0	Sundsvall	Östersund
15:00 GMT	Keita (yellow card) 2'; Edwards (yellow card) 51'; Stadler 52'; Ghoddos 63'; Nouri 82' (pen.); Aiesh (yellow card) 88' (goal) 89'	Report	Krogh Gerson (yellow card) 38'	Stadium: Jämtkraft Arena; Attendance: 8,208; Referee: Kaspar Sjöberg

15 August 2016 18	Jönköping	1–1 (Note: Game abandoned in the 90th minute, declared a 1–1 draw.)	Östersund	Jönköping
18:00 GMT	Aasmundsen (yellow card) 7'; Thelin 77'	Report	Dyer 25'; Sollander (yellow card) 79'	Stadium: Stadsparksvallen; Attendance: 4,462; Referee: Jonas Eriksson

20 August 2016 19	Östersund	1–0	Djurgården	Östersund
15:00 GMT	Sema 13'; Keita (yellow card) 61'; Widgren (yellow card) 68'; Papagiannopoulos (yellow card) 79'	Report	Walker (yellow card) 83'	Stadium: Jämtkraft Arena; Attendance: 8,027; Referee: Martin Strömbergsson

28 August 2016 20	Häcken	3–1	Östersund	Gothenburg
14:00 GMT	Ericsson (yellow card) 24'; Abubakari (yellow card) 28'; Mohammed 51'; Owoeri 73' (yellow card) 79'; Dyer 85' (o.g.)	Report	Edwards 26'	Stadium: Bravida Arena; Attendance: 2,026; Referee: Kaspar Sjöberg

11 September 2016 21	Östersund	2–0	Helsingborg	Östersund
16:30 GMT	Edwards 13'; Dyer 21'; Ghoddos (yellow card) 37'; Papagiannopoulos (yellow card) 39'; Gero (yellow card) 74'	Report	Larsson (yellow card) 37'; Lange (yellow card) 39'; Rusike (yellow card) 89'; Helstrup (yellow card) 90'	Stadium: Jämtkraft Arena; Attendance: 5,137; Referee: Mohammed Al Hakim

17 September 2016 22	Kalmar	2–0	Östersund	Kalmar
15:00 GMT	V. Elm (yellow card) 23'; Anier 39' (yellow card) 62'; Mael 41'; Hallberg (yellow card) 81'	Report	Dyer (yellow card) 12'; Nouri (yellow card) 50'; Aiesh (yellow card) 85'	Stadium: Guldfågeln Arena; Attendance: 4,856; Referee: Glenn Nyberg

21 September 2016 23	Östersund	0–2	Norrköping	Östersund
18:00 GMT	Mukiibi (red card) 62'; Dyer (yellow card) 90+2'	Report	Andersson 28' 64'	Stadium: Jämtkraft Arena; Attendance: 5,676; Referee: Martin Strömbergsson

26 September 2016 24	Göteborg	2–0	Östersund	Gothenburg
18:00 GMT	Rieks 34'; Ómarsson 73'	Report	Papagiannopoulos (yellow card) 61'	Stadium: Gamla Ullevi; Attendance: 10,211; Referee: Stefan Johannesson

1 October 2016 25	Östersund	6–1	Falkenberg	Östersund
15:00 GMT	Dyer 32' 68' (pen.); Gero 43' 45+1'; Nouri 52' (pen.); Sema 69'	Report	J. Karlsson 8'; P. Karlsson (yellow card) 34'; Sjöstedt (yellow card) 75'	Stadium: Jämtkraft Arena; Attendance: 4,622; Referee: Martin Strömbergsson

16 October 2016 26	AIK	2–0	Östersund	Solna
14:00 GMT	Isak 10'; Hauksson (yellow card) 72'; Obasi 83'	Report		Stadium: Friends Arena; Attendance: 13,053; Referee: Mohammed Al Hakim

22 October 2016 27	Malmö	0–3	Östersund	Solna
14:00 GMT	Yotún (yellow card) 26'; Lewicki (yellow card) 65'; Bengtsson (yellow card) 80'; Adu (yellow card) 85'; Konate (yellow card) 90+4'	Report	Ghoddos 37' 86'; Bachirou 51'; Mensah (yellow card) 85'	Stadium: Friends Arena; Attendance: 13,053; Referee: Mohammed Al Hakim

26 October 2016 28	Östersund	2–0	Hammarby	Östersund
18:00 GMT	Gero 73'; Curtis Edwards 90+3'	Report	Israelsson (yellow card) 81'	Stadium: Jämtkraft Arena; Attendance: 6,664; Referee: Bojan Pandžić

31 October 2016 29	Örebro	1–5	Östersund	Örebro
18:00 GMT	Åhman-Persson 28'; Hines-Ike (yellow card) 80'	Report	Dyer 3'; Sema 19' 85'; Ghoddos 41' (pen.) 75'	Stadium: Behrn Arena; Attendance: 4,612; Referee: Magnus Lindgren

6 November 2016 30	Östersund	2–4	Gefle	Östersund
14:00 GMT	Dyer 19'; Gero (yellow card) 53'; Stadler (yellow card) 86'; Ghoddos 90+2'	Report	Lantto 7' (yellow card) 90+4'; Oremo 10' 69'; Bertilsson 63'	Stadium: Jämtkraft Arena; Attendance: 4,778; Referee: Mohammed Al Hakim

=== Svenska Cupen ===
Win Draw Loss

20 February 2016 Group Stage	Norrköping	4–0	Östersund	Norrköping
13:00 GMT	Traustason 18' (yellow card) 81'; Bärkroth 36'; Kujović 72'; Telo (yellow card) 82'; Enarsson 90+3'	Report	Gero (yellow card) 14'; Papagiannopoulos (yellow card) 62'	Stadium: Nya Parken; Attendance: 1,423; Referee: Johan Krantz

27 February 2016 Group Stage	Jönköpings Södra	1–0	Östersund	Jönköping
14:00 GMT	Aiesh 17' (o.g.); Fendrich (yellow card) 25'; Siwe (yellow card) 45'; Smylie (yellow card) 61'; Svensson (yellow card) 88'	Report	Mukiibi (yellow card) 66'; Ghoddos (yellow card) 69'; Omoh (yellow card) 70'	Stadium: Stadsparksvallen; Attendance: 344; Referee: Antti Kanerva

6 March 2016 Group Stage	Östersund	3–0	AFC United	Östersund
13:00 GMT	Gero 13', 44'; Ghoddos 40'	Report	Buya Turay (yellow card) 36'; El Kabir (yellow card) 41'	Stadium: Jämtkraft Arena; Attendance: 671; Referee: Johan Krantz

6 September 2016 Round 2	Sollentuna	0–2	Östersund	Sollentuna Municipality
18:00 GMT	Thorstensson (yellow card) 90+1'	Report	Ghoddos 17'; Dyer (yellow card) 34'; Papagiannopoulos (yellow card) 61'; Stadler 66'	Stadium: Sollentunavallen; Attendance: 261; Referee: Fredrik Hansson

== Statistics ==
=== Appearances ===
No.	Pos.	Name	Allsvenskan		Svenska Cupen		Total		Discipline	
No.	Pos.	Name	Apps	Goals	Apps	Goals	Apps	Goals	Yellow card	Red card
1	GK	(Sweden) Aly Keita	8	0	1	0	9	0	2	0
4	MF	(Sweden) Sebastian Lundbäck	0	0	0	0	0	0	0	0
5	DF	(Ethiopia) Walid Atta	14 (4)	2	1	0	19	2	0	0
6	DF	(Sweden) Doug Bergqvist	11 (3)	0	2	0	16	0	2	0
7	MF	(Nigeria) Monday Samuel	2 (3)	0	0	0	5	0	0	0
8	MF	(England) Jamie Hopcutt	0 (1)	0	0 (1)	0	2	0	0	0
10	MF	(Sweden) Hosam Aiesh	3 (3)	1	1 (2)	0	9	1	1	0
11	FW	(United States) Andrew Stadler	10 (5)	3	2 (1)	1	18	3	0	0
12	MF	(Sweden) Ken Sema	9 (6)	1	3	0	18	1	0	0
14	DF	(Sweden) Bobo Sollander	2 (2)	0	1	0	5	0	1	0
16	GK	(Sweden) Hampus Nilsson	0	0	1	0	1	0		0
17	MF	(England) Curtis Edwards	3 (1)	1	0	0	4	1	1	0
18	FW	(Nigeria) Alhaji Gero	7 (5)	0	4	2	16	2	2	0
19	DF	(Sweden) Dennis Widgren	20	0	2	0	22	0	1	0
20	MF	(Sweden) Gabriel Somi	9 (2)	0	2 (2)	0	15	0	2	0
21	MF	(Comoros) Fouad Bachirou	11 (2)	0	0 (1)	0	14	0	1	0
22	MF	(Iraq) Brwa Nouri	19	3	3 (1)	0	23	3	2	0
23	MF	(Montserrat) Alex Dyer	15 (1)	4	4	0	20	4	4	0
24	DF	(Sweden) Ronald Mukiibi	11 (1)	3	4	0	16	3	1	0
25	DF	(Ghana) Samuel Mensiro	4 (3)	0	0 (2)	0	9	0	0	0
27	MF	(Sweden) Piotr Johansson	2 (3)	0	1	0	6	0	0	0
31	DF	(Sweden) Sotirios Papagiannopoulos	19	0	3	0	21	0	7	0
39	DF	(Sweden) Stefan Karlsson	5 (1)	1	0	0	7	0	0	0
93	FW	(Sweden) Saman Ghoddos	18 (1)	5	4	2	23	7	2	0
Players who left the club in August/January transfer window or on loan
9	FW	(Sweden) Emir Smajic	4 (5)	1	1 (1)	0	11	1	0	0
27	GK	(England) Jamal Blackman	12	0	0	0	12	0	0	0
29	FW	(Nigeria) Michael Omoh	4 (3)	0	1 (1)	0	9	0	1	0
77	GK	(Iceland) Haraldur Björnsson	0	0	2	0	2	0	0	0

Last updated: 7 September 2016.
Source: Östersunds FK

=== Top scorers ===
The list is sorted by shirt number when total goals are equal.

Rnk	Pos	No.	Player	Allsvenskan	Svenska Cupen	Total
1	FW	93	(Sweden) Saman Ghoddos	10	2	12
2	MF	23	(Montserrat) Alex Dyer	9	0	9
3	FW	18	(Nigeria) Alhaji Gero	3	2	5
5	FW	11	(United States) Andrew Stadler	3	1	4
5	MF	12	(Sweden) Ken Sema	4	0	4
5	MF	22	(Iraq) Brwa Nouri	4	0	4
7	MF	17	(England) Curtis Edwards	3	0	3
7	DF	24	(Sweden) Ronald Mukiibi	3	0	3
9	DF	5	(Ethiopia) Walid Atta	2	0	2
10	FW	9	(Sweden) Emir Smajic	1	0	1
10	MF	10	(Sweden) Hosam Aiesh	1	0	1
Own goals				0	0	0
TOTALS				43	5	48

Last updated: 9 May 2017.
Source: Östersunds FK

=== Clean sheets ===
The list is sorted by shirt number when total appearances are equal.

Rnk	No.	Player	Allsvenskan	Svenska Cupen	Total
1	1	(Sweden) Aly Keita	4	0	4
2	27	(England) Jamal Blackman	3	0	3
3	16	(Sweden) Hampus Nilsson	0	1	1
3	77	(Iceland) Haraldur Björnsson	0	1	1
TOTALS			7	2	9

Last updated: 7 September 2016.
Source: Östersunds FK

=== Summary ===
Games played	23 (20 Allsvenskan) (4 Svenska Cupen)
Games won	9 (8 Allsvenskan) (2 Svenska Cupen)
Games drawn	5 (5 Allsvenskan) (0 Svenska Cupen)
Games lost	9 (7 Allsvenskan) (2 Svenska Cupen)
Goals scored	29 (26 Allsvenskan) (5 Svenska Cupen)
Goals conceded	36 (31 Allsvenskan) (5 Svenska Cupen)
Goal difference	–7 (–5 Allsvenskan) (0 Svenska Cupen)
Clean sheets	8 (7 Allsvenskan) (2 Svenska Cupen)
Yellow cards	28 (23 Allsvenskan) (7 Svenska Cupen)
Red cards	0 (0 Allsvenskan) (0 Svenska Cupen)
Most appearances	23 Appearances (Saman Ghoddos)
Top scorer	7 (Saman Ghoddos)
Winning Percentage	Overall: 10/24 (41.67%)

Last updated: 7 September 2016.
Source: Östersunds FK

== Awards ==
=== Player ===
No.	Player	Award	Month	Source
