= 2017 Östersunds FK season =

Östersunds FK
2017 season
- Chairman: Daniel Kindberg
- Head Coach: Graham Potter
- Allsvenskan: 5th
- Svenska Cupen (2016–17): Champions
- Svenska Cupen (2017–18): Group stage
- UEFA Europa League (2017–18): Round of 32
Home colors	Away colors

The 2017 Östersunds FK season was the club's 22nd season of existence, and their second season in the top-tier of Swedish football. Östersunds FK competed in the Allsvenskan, the Svenska Cupen and the UEFA Europa League.

== Transfers ==
=== In ===
No.11	Pos.Winger	Player Erick Garcia	Transferred from Orlando City B	Fee 1,000,000	Date January 3, 2017	Source FIFA

=== Out ===
No.	Pos.	Player	Transferred to	Fee	Date	Source

== Competitions ==
=== Allsvenskan ===
==== League table ====
Pos	Team	Pld	W	D	L	GF	GA	GD	Pts	Qualification or relegation
3	Djurgårdens IF	30	15	8	7	54	30	+24	53	Qualification for the Europa League second qualifying round (Note: Since the winners of 2017–18 Svenska Cupen (Djurgårdens IF) qualified for European competitions based on their league position, the berth awarded to the 3rd-placed team (Europa League second qualifying round) was passed down to the 4th-placed team (BK Häcken).)
4	BK Häcken	30	14	10	6	42	28	+14	52	Qualification for the Europa League first qualifying round
5	Östersunds FK	30	13	11	6	48	32	+16	50	
6	IFK Norrköping	30	14	6	10	45	40	+5	48	
7	IK Sirius	30	11	7	12	46	51	−5	40	

Source: svenskfotboll.se (in Swedish)
Rules for classification: 1) Points; 2) Goal difference; 3) Goals scored; 4) Head-to-head points; 5) Head-to-head goal difference; 6) Head-to-head away goals scored; 7) Play-off
(Note: Play-off is only played if need to decide champion, teams for relegation or UEFA competition and will be played on a neutral ground).

==== Results ====
1 April 2017 1	Halmstad	1–0	Östersund	Halmstad
10:00	Roerslev (yellow card) 30'; Hakšabanović 38'; Henningsson (yellow card) 88'	Report	Somi (yellow card) 90'; Ghoddos (yellow card) 90+1'	Stadium: Örjans Vall; Attendance: 5,223; Referee: Jonas Eriksson

9 April 2017 2	Östersund	1–0	Norrköping	Östersund
10:00	Aiesh 5'; Mensiro (yellow card) 31'; Keita (yellow card) 76'	Report	Smith (yellow card) 69'; Bärkroth (yellow card) 84'	Stadium: Jämtkraft Arena; Attendance: 4,644; Referee: Stefan Johannesson

16 April 2017 3	Örebro	2–1	Östersund	Örebro
09:00	Omoh 34'; Ring 57'; Hines-Ike (yellow card) 82'	Report	Sema (yellow card) 86'; Nouri 89'	Stadium: Behrn Arena; Attendance: 5,947; Referee: Bojan Pandzic

23 April 2017 4	Östersund	1–1	Göteborg	Östersund
11:30	Edwards 61'; Bergqvist (yellow card) 89'	Report	Rogne (yellow card) 85'; Salomonsson 90+3' (pen.)	Stadium: Jämtkraft Arena; Attendance: 4,317; Referee: Glenn Nyberg

=== Svenska Cupen (2016–17) ===
==== Group stage ====
===== Table =====
Pos	Team	Pld	W	D	L	GF	GA	GD	Pts	Qualification
1	Östersunds FK	3	3	0	0	8	2	+6	9	Advance to Knockout stage
2	Hammarby IF	3	1	1	1	6	6	0	4	
3	Varbergs BoIS	3	0	2	1	5	6	−1	2	
4	Nyköpings BIS	3	0	1	2	4	9	−5	1	

Source: Swedish Football Association
Rules for classification: 1) Points; 2) Goal difference; 3) Goals scored; 4) Head-to-head record; 5) Highest ranked team

===== Results =====
18 February 2017 1	Östersund	2–1	Varbergs BoIS	Östersund
14:00	Ghoddos 18', 90+4'	Report	Palmquist 69'	Stadium: Jämtkraft Arena; Attendance: 1,300; Referee: Patrik Eriksson

25 February 2017 2	Nyköping	1–5	Östersund	Nyköping
16:00	Björk 52'	Report	Sema 4'; Bertilsson 24', 63'; Aiesh 50', 66'	Stadium: Rosvalla IP; Attendance: 355; Referee: Farouk Nehdi

5 March 2017 3	Östersund	1–0	Hammarby	Östersund
14:00	Aiesh 5'	Report		Stadium: Jämtkraft Arena; Attendance: 1,516; Referee: Bojan Pandzic

==== Knockout round ====
11 March 2017 Quarter-final	Östersund	4–1	Trelleborg	Östersund
16:00	Bertilsson 7'; Nouri 27' (pen.); Ghoddos 48'; Bojanić 90+2'	Report	Islamović 87'	Stadium: Jämtkraft Arena; Attendance: 1,520; Referee: Kristoffer Karlsson

18 March 2017 Semi-final	Häcken	1–3	Östersund	Gothenburg
18:30	Kamara 32'	Report	Pettersson 6'; Ghoddos 30', 87'	Stadium: Bravida Arena; Attendance: 1,632; Referee: Andreas Ekberg

13 April 2017 Final	Östersund	4–1	Norrköping	Östersund
16:00	Mensah 8'; Aiesh 18'; Gero 83'; Ghoddos 86'	Report	Wahlqvist 54'	Stadium: Jämtkraft Arena; Attendance: 8,369; Referee: Mohammed Al-Hakim (Västerås)

=== Svenska Cupen (2017–18) ===
==== Qualifying rounds ====
10 October 2017 Second round	Härnösand	0–2	Östersund	Härnösand
19:00		Report	Bertilsson 53'; Edwards 75'	Stadium: Högslättens IP; Attendance: 1,466; Referee: Niklas Abrahamsson

==== Group stage ====
Group stage was played during the 2018 season.

=== UEFA Europa League (2017–18) ===
==== Second qualifying round ====
13 July 2017 First leg	Östersunds FK (Sweden)	2–0	(Turkey) Galatasaray	Östersund, Sweden
19:00 CET	Gero (yellow card) 18'; Pettersson (yellow card) 35'; Ghoddos 68'; Hopcutt 90+2'	Report	Ciğerci (yellow card) 17'; Öztekin (yellow card) 90+4'	Stadium: Jämtkraft Arena; Attendance: 5,407; Referee: Juan Martínez Munuera (Spain)

20 July 2017 Second leg	Galatasaray (Turkey)	1–1 (1–3 agg.)	(Sweden) Östersunds FK	Istanbul, Turkey
20:30 TRT	Gomis (yellow card) 20'; Muslera (yellow card) 39'; Ciğerci (yellow card) 49'; Çalık 69'; Rodrigues (yellow card) 87'; Belhanda (yellow card) 90+2'	Report	Nouri 60'	Stadium: Türk Telekom Stadium; Attendance: 33,646; Referee: Bastian Dankert (Germany)

==== Third qualifying round ====
27 July 2017 First leg	Östersund (Sweden)	1–0	(Luxembourg) Fola Esch	Östersund, Sweden
19:00	Bachirou 50'	Report		Stadium: Jämtkraft Arena; Attendance: 6,061; Referee: Yevhen Aranovsky (Ukraine)

3 August 2017 Second leg	Fola Esch (Luxembourg)	1–2 (1–3 agg.)	(Sweden) Östersund	Esch-sur-Alzette, Luxembourg
19:30	Bensi 53'	Report	Somi 59'; Pettersson 66'	Stadium: Stade Émile Mayrisch; Attendance: 1,590; Referee: Kristo Tohver (Estonia)

==== Play-off round ====
17 August 2017 First leg	PAOK (Greece)	3–1	(Sweden) Östersund	Thessaloniki, Greece
21:00 EET, UTC+03:00	Rey (yellow card) 21'; Matos 38'; Prijović 77', 88' (pen.)	UEFA Report	21' (pen.) Nouri; (yellow card) 37' Mukiibi; (yellow card) 87' Keita	Stadium: Toumba Stadium; Attendance: – Referee: (Netherlands) Bas Nijhuis

24 August 2017 Second leg	Östersund (Sweden)	2–0 (3–3 (a) agg.)	(Greece) PAOK	Östersund, Sweden
20:00 EET, UTC+03:00	Mukiibi (yellow card) 19'; Pettersson (yellow card) 68'; Ghoddos 71', 77'; Hopcutt (yellow card) 84'; Edwards (yellow card) 90'; Aiesh (yellow card) 90+4'	UEFA Report	(yellow card) 20' Matos; (yellow card) 27' Prijović; (yellow card) 70' Pedro Henrique; (yellow card) 77' Cimirot	Stadium: Jämtkraft Arena; Referee: (Poland) Paweł Raczkowski

==== Group stage ====
===== Table =====
Pos	Team	Pld	W	D	L	GF	GA	GD	Pts	Qualification
1	(Spain) Athletic Bilbao	6	3	2	1	8	5	+3	11 (Note: Head-to-head results: Östersund 2–2 Athletic Bilbao, Athletic Bilbao 1–0 Östersund.)	Advance to knockout phase
2	(Sweden) Östersunds FK	6	3	2	1	8	4	+4	11	Advance to knockout phase
3	(Ukraine) Zorya Luhansk	6	2	0	4	3	9	−6	6	
4	(Germany) Hertha BSC	6	1	2	3	6	7	−1	5	

Source: UEFA
Rules for classification: Group stage tiebreakers

===== Results =====
14 September 2017 1	Zorya Luhansk (Ukraine)	0–2	(Sweden) Östersund	Lviv, Ukraine
22:05 EEST (UTC+03:00)	Kharatin (yellow card) 79'	Report	Bachirou (yellow card) 43'; Ghoddos 50'; Mensiro (yellow card) 72'; Aiesh (yellow card) 83'; Gero 90+4'	Stadium: Arena Lviv; Attendance: 5,097; Referee: Stephan Klossner

28 September 2017 2	Östersund (Sweden)	1–0	(Germany) Hertha BSC	Östersund, Sweden
19:00 CEST (UTC+2)	Nouri 22' (pen.)	Report		Stadium: Jämtkraft Arena; Attendance: 8,009; Referee: Luca Banti (Italy)

19 October 2017 3	Östersund (Sweden)	2–2	(Spain) Athletic Bilbao	Östersund, Sweden
19:00 CEST (UTC+02:00)	Mukiibi (yellow card) 6'; Gero 52' (yellow card) 72'; Sema (yellow card) 55'; Edwards 64'	Report; Report 2	Aduriz 14'; Córdoba (yellow card) 24'; Williams 89'	Stadium: Jämtkraft Arena; Attendance: 7,870; Referee: István Kovács (Romania)

2 November 2017 4	Athletic Bilbao (Spain)	1–0	(Sweden) Östersund	Bilbao, Spain
21:05 CET (UTC+01:00)	Lekue (yellow card) 16'; Balenziaga (yellow card) 64'; Núñez (yellow card) 67' (yellow-red card) 89'; Aduriz 70'; Susaeta (yellow card) 84'	Report	Mukiibi (yellow card) 81'	Stadium: San Mamés; Attendance: 32,354; Referee: Paweł Gil (Poland)

23 November 2017 5	Östersund (Sweden)	2–0	(Ukraine) Zorya Luhansk	Östersund, Sweden
20:00 EET (UTC+02:00)	Hrechyshkin 40' (o.g.); Edwards (yellow card) 51'; Ghoddos 77'	Report	Andriyevskyi (yellow card) 53'; Karavayev (yellow card) 54'; Babenko (yellow card) 79'; Svatok (yellow card) 82'	Stadium: Jämtkraft Arena; Attendance: 7,754; Referee: Kevin Blom

7 December 2017 6	Hertha BSC (Germany)	1–1	(Sweden) Östersund	Berlin, Germany
21:05 CET (UTC+1)	Pekarík 61'	Report	Papagiannopoulos 58'	Stadium: Olympiastadion Berlin; Attendance: 15,686; Referee: Tiago Martins (Portugal)

==== Round of 32 ====
The round of 32 was played during the 2018 Östersunds FK season
