= 2017 Svenska Cupen final =

- Event: 2016–17 Svenska Cupen
Östersunds FK	IFK Norrköping
4	1
- Date: 13 April 2017
- Venue: Jämtkraft Arena, Östersund
- Referee: Mohammed Al-Hakim
- Attendance: 8,369

The 2017 Svenska Cupen final was played on 13 April 2017. The match was played at Jämtkraft Arena, Östersund, the home ground of Östersunds FK, determined in a draw on 19 March 2017 after the semi-finals.

The Allsvenskan clubs Östersunds FK and IFK Norrköping contested the final, with the winner earning a place in the second qualifying round of the 2017–18 UEFA Europa League. Östersunds FK played their first ever Svenska Cupen final. IFK Norrköping played their first final since 1994 and their 11th in total. Östersunds FK won their first Svenska Cupen title after defeating IFK Norrköping 4–1. This was the first time a Svenska Cupen final was played on artificial turf.

== Route to the final ==
Note: In all results below, the score of the finalist is given first.

Östersunds FK		Round	IFK Norrköping	
Opponent	Result	Initial rounds	Opponent	Result
Sollentuna FF	2–0 (A)	Second round	Västerås SK	4–0 (A)
Opponent	Result	Group stage	Opponent	Result
Varbergs BoIS	2–1 (H)	Matchday 1	Örgryte IS	1–1 (H)
Nyköpings BIS	5–1 (A)	Matchday 2	Vänersborgs FK	2–2 (A)
Hammarby IF	1–0 (H)	Matchday 3	Halmstads BK	7–0 (H)
Group 7 winner: Pos / Team / Pld / Pts; 1 / Östersunds FK / 3 / 9; 2 / Hammarby IF / 3 / 4; 3 / Varbergs BoIS / 3 / 2; 4 / Nyköpings BIS / 3 / 1; Source: Swedish Football Association		Final standings	Group 2 winner: Pos / Team / Pld / Pts; 1 / IFK Norrköping / 3 / 5; 2 / Vänersborgs FK / 3 / 5; 3 / Halmstads BK / 3 / 4; 4 / Örgryte IS / 3 / 1; Source: Swedish Football Association	
Opponent	Result	Knockout stage	Opponent	Result
Trelleborgs FF	4–1 (H)	Quarter-finals	IFK Göteborg	2–1 (A)
BK Häcken	3–1 (A)	Semi-finals	IF Brommapojkarna	4–0 (H)

== Match ==
=== Details ===
13 April 2017
16:00 UTC+2

Östersunds FK	4–1	IFK Norrköping
Mensiro 9'; Aiesh 18'; Gero 83'; Ghoddos 86'	Report	Wahlqvist 54'

Jämtkraft Arena, Östersund
Attendance: 8,369
Referee: Mohammed Al-Hakim

Östersunds FK	IFK Norrköping

GK	1	(Sweden) (Guinea) Aly Keita
RB	23	(Ghana) Samuel Mensiro	9'
CB	6	(Sweden) Doug Bergqvist
CB	2	(Sweden) Tom Pettersson
LB	19	(Sweden) Dennis Widgren
RM	10	(Sweden) (Palestine) Hosam Aiesh	18'	(substituted off) 66'
CM	17	(England) Curtis Edwards
CM	22	(Iraq) Brwa Nouri (c)
LM	12	(Sweden) Ken Sema
CF	93	(Sweden) (Iran) Saman Ghoddos	86'	(substituted off) 90'
CF	9	(Nigeria) Alhaji Gero	83' (yellow card) 83'	(substituted off) 90+2'
Substitutes:
GK	18	(Sweden) Andreas Andersson
DF	4	(Sweden) (Greece) Sotirios Papagiannopoulos		(substituted in) 66'
DF	14	(Sweden) Bobo Sollander
DF	15	(Sweden) Tim Björkström		(substituted in) 90'
MF	5	(Sweden) Darijan Bojanić
MF	8	(England) Jamie Hopcutt		(substituted in) 90+2'
MF	11	(Sweden) Johan Bertilsson
Manager:
(England) Graham Potter

GK	31	(Austria) Michael Langer
RB	6	(Sweden) Linus Wahlqvist	54' (yellow card) 34'
CB	4	(Sweden) Andreas Johansson (c)
CB	14	(Sweden) Eric Smith
LB	11	(Sweden) Christopher Telo
RM	8	(Sweden) Nicklas Bärkroth
CM	25	(Sweden) Filip Dagerstål		(substituted off) 79'
CM	20	(Finland) Daniel Sjölund
LM	23	(Sweden) Niclas Eliasson		(substituted off) 75'
CF	17	(Sweden) Karl Holmberg	(yellow card) 45'
CF	19	(Sweden) Sebastian Andersson
Substitutes:
GK	29	(Sweden) Julius Lindgren
DF	13	(Iceland) Alfons Sampsted
DF	15	(Sweden) Marcus Falk-Olander
DF	21	(Sweden) Andreas Hadenius		(substituted in) 79'
DF	30	(Croatia) Nikola Tkalčić
MF	16	(Sweden) Pontus Almqvist
MF	18	(Iceland) Guðmundur Þórarinsson		(substituted in) 75'
Manager:
(Sweden) Jens Gustafsson

Assistant referees:
Fredrik Nilsson (Svalöv)
Magnus Sjöblom (Asmundtorp)
Fourth official:
Johan Krantz (Uppsala)

Match rules

- 90 minutes.
- 30 minutes of extra time if necessary.
- Penalty shoot-out if scores still level.
- Seven named substitutes, of which up to three may be used.
