= Sotirios Papagiannopoulos =

Swedish footballer

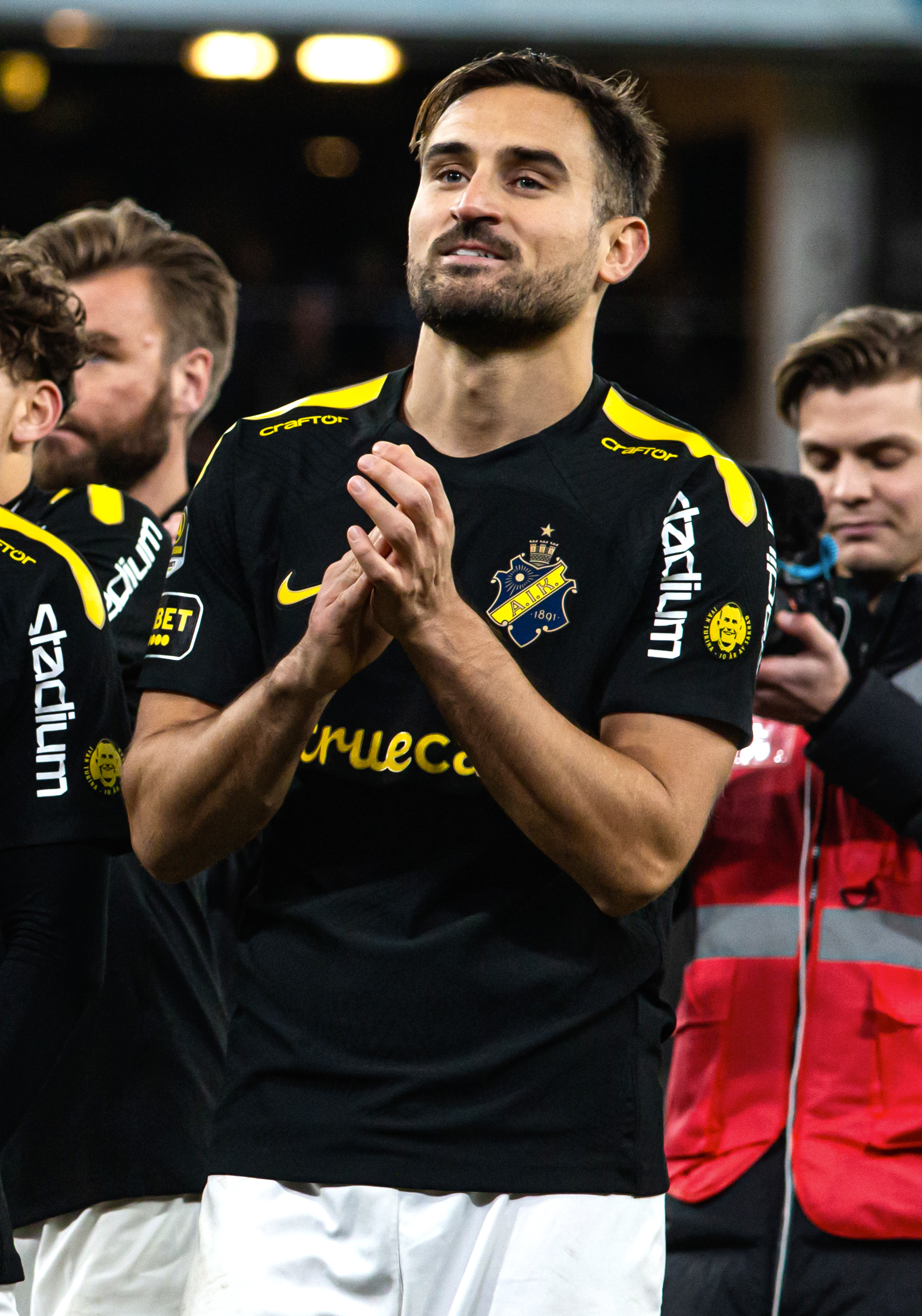
- Papagiannopoulos playing for AIK in 2023

Personal information
- Full name: Sotirios Papagiannopoulos
- Date of birth: 5 September 1990 (age 36)
- Place of birth: Stockholm, Sweden
- Height: 1.90 m (6 ft 3 in)
- Position: Centre-back

Team information
- Current team: AIK
- Number: 4

Youth career
- 1994–2008: AIK

Senior career*
Years	Team	Apps	(Gls)
2008–2011	Väsby United	38	(0)
2008–2010	→ Akropolis IF (loan)	23	(0)
2011–2012	Akropolis IF	24	(5)
2012–2015	Assyriska FF	75	(4)
2015	PAOK	7	(0)
2015–2018	Östersunds FK	64	(3)
2018–2020	Copenhagen	45	(0)
2020–	AIK	156	(4)

International career^{‡}
2009	Sweden U19	3	(0)
2018–2022	Sweden	5	(0)
- * Club domestic league appearances and goals as of 8 July 2026 ‡ National team caps and goals as of 19:59, 12 June 2022 (UTC)

Sotirios Papagiannopoulos (Greek: Σωτήριος Παπαγιαννόπουλος; born 5 September 1990) is a Swedish professional footballer who plays as a centre-back for Allsvenskan club AIK. He has won five caps for the Sweden national team.

== Club career ==
=== Career in Sweden ===
Papagiannopoulos’ playing career began in the youth system of AIK. He played for the club's U-19 team before making the switch to his first professional senior side in Väsby United. His defensive abilities and goal-scoring prowess saw him continue to raise eyebrows. His coach had said: "If he works hard, he can be a very good player". After two years on Väsby's squad, Papagiannopoulos signed for Akropolis IF on loan. He was a basic toll for his new team and participated in 24 matches. Assyriska FF came calling in 2011 and Papagiannopoulos began a four-year stint with the Swedish second division club. He made 75 appearances for the team in those four seasons producing consistent and steady performances at the back for his team. "He has a great season with Acropolis, being the captain of the club. We have followed his progress for years, he is aggressive, fast, has good passing game. He was a high priority for us and it feels good that he chose us in front of several other competing clubs." said Assyriska manager Aydin Aho to the club's website. He made very good appearances with Assyriska FF and participated in 82 matches, in all competitions.

=== PAOK ===
After three successful years with Assyriska FF, Papagiannopoulos signed for PAOK in January 2015 for 2,5 years. "It's always been a dream to come to a Greek big club," said 24-year-old to Fotbolltransfers.com. PAOK manager Angelos Anastasiadis was told about the player and decided to take a look at him in training. Anastasiadis liked what he saw and believed that with a little fine tuning Papagiannopoulos could make the grade for the Thessaloniki giants.

He made his debut in Super League Greece against AEL Kalloni as a substitute. He made seven appearances during the rest of that season. Anastasiadis had tabbed him as one for the future. As he began to acclimate to life in Greece with PAOK, he was shown the door in surprise fashion. Anastasiadis’ departure from the club meant that the Swede's biggest supporter was gone. In August 2015, then PAOK manager Igor Tudor expressed to Papagiannopoulos he wasn't part of his plans. The player was earning €2,500 per month, a paltry sum compared with his teammates. Despite his low cost to the club, he was released .

=== Return to Sweden ===
Östersunds FK has announced the centre back Sotirios Papagiannopoulos, as a free transfer from PAOK. "We've known him for a long time, since his time in Assyrian. We have been impressed with his speed, strength and confidence. We are delighted to have him here and continue his development with us." says manager Graham Potter to the club's website. Papagiannopoulos made an instant impact at the ambitious club. He helped lead Ostersunds to promotion to the Swedish Allsvenskan, the nation's top-flight, for the first time in the club's history. Last season, the 27-year-old was an integral part of the team that won the Swedish Cup as Ostersunds fairytale continued. On 13 April 2017, Papagiannopoulos was a substitute in the 2016–17 Svenska Cupen final, where the goals from Samuel Mensah, Hosam Aiesh, Alhaji Gero and Saman Ghoddos powered the Jämtkraft Arena outfit to their first major silverware and a place in the Europa League play-offs for next season, as they triumphed against IFK Norrköping with 4–1. On 28 October 2017, he opened the score in a triumphant 4–1 home win game against IF Elfsborg. It was his first goal with the club in all competitions.

The Greek centre back was a key member of Östersunds FK in the 2017–18 UEFA Europa League, as they eliminated among others PAOK and Galatasaray in the preliminary rounds and have already qualified from Group J in the last 32, eliminating clubs with higher budget and experience. The club reached the knockout stage of the 2017–18 UEFA Europa League tournament after finishing second in Group J, level on points with Athletic Bilbao and ahead of Zorya Luhansk and Hertha Berlin. Papagiannopoulos has been ever-present in the team even managing to score away to Hertha in the group finale, where he was also named Man of the Match. In January 2018, Papagiannopoulos despite the interest of Belgian club Standard Liège, he renewed his contract with Östersunds FK for another year.

=== Copenhagen ===
On 27 May 2018, Copenhagen have signed Swedish defender Sotirios Papagiannopoulos from Östersunds FK on a four-year deal for an undisclosed fee."Sotirios has all the skills to be a very strong central defender at FCK, and we are very happy with the signing," says manager Ståle Solbakken. "We have known about him for a while and were especially impressed with his performances in the Europa League. He is fast, physically strong and good with the ball, and he has international experience from club level and the Swedish national team." Papagiannopoulos spoke to FCK.dk and said: "This is a big step in my career! I've had a tremendous time in Östersund, and now I'm really looking forward to this challenge." The Greek-Swedish defender will be Erik Berg's replacement in the Danish squad as he asked to leave the club to return to Sweden.

== International career ==
Papagiannopoulos was eligible to play for either Sweden or Greece. On 5 December 2017, he was called up to Sweden for two friendlies against Estonia and Denmark. On 7 January 2018 Papagiannopoulos made his international debut, coming on as a substitute in the 64th minute in a 1–0 win against Estonia.

== Personal life ==
Papagiannopoulos is of Greek descent. His family is from Mousiotitsa.

== Career statistics ==
=== International ===
Appearances and goals by national team and year
National team	Year	Apps	Goals
Sweden	2018	3	0
Sweden	2019	1	0
Sweden	2020	0	0
Sweden	2021	0	0
Sweden	2022	1	0
Total		5	0

== Honours ==
Copenhagen

- Danish Superliga: 2018–19

Östersunds FK

- Svenska Cupen: 2016–17
