= Emir Smajic =

Swedish-Bosnian footballer

Personal information
- Full name: Emir Smajic
- Date of birth: 3 February 1989 (age 37)
- Place of birth: Sweden
- Height: 1.95 m (6 ft 5 in)
- Position: Forward

Team information
- Current team: Västerås SK
- Number: 9

Youth career
- –2010: Märsta IK

Senior career*
Years	Team	Apps	(Gls)
2010–2012	IK Sirius	21	(5)
2012	Västerås SK	12	(9)
2012–2016	Östersunds FK	51	(17)
2016	IF Brommapojkarna	12	(1)
2017	Achilles '29	17	(4)
2017–	Västerås SK	7	(0)
- * Club domestic league appearances and goals as of 30 November 2017

Emir Smajic (born 3 February 1989) is a Swedish-Bosnian footballer who currently plays for Västerås SK as a forward.

== Career statistics ==
Club	Season	Division	League		Svenska Cupen		Total	
Club	Season	Division	Apps	Goals	Apps	Goals	Apps	Goals
IK Sirius	2010	Division 1	2	0	0	0	2	0
IK Sirius	2011	Division 1	19	5	1	0	20	5
Västerås SK	2012	Division 1	12	9	0	0	12	9
Östersunds FK	2012	Division 1	11	8	1	0	12	8
Östersunds FK	2013	Superettan	1	0	0	0	1	0
Östersunds FK	2014	Superettan	16	7	2	1	18	8
Östersunds FK	2015	Superettan	14	1	0	0	14	1
Östersunds FK	2016	Allsvenskan	9	1	2	0	11	1
Career totals			88	35	6	1	91	36
