= Monday Samuel =

Nigerian footballer

Personal information
- Full name: Samuel Monday Ayinoko Abu
- Date of birth: 12 November 1993 (age 33)
- Place of birth: Nigeria
- Height: 1.74 m (5 ft 8 1/2 in)
- Position: Midfielder

Team information
- Current team: Högaborgs BK

Youth career
- 2010–2011: ABS
- 2011–2012: Benfica

Senior career*
Years	Team	Apps	(Gls)
2012–2015	Ängelholms FF	53	(11)
2015–2016	Östersunds FK	8	(0)
2016–2017	Helsingborgs IF	30	(3)
2018	Landskrona BoIS	23	(7)
2019	Thanh Hóa	13	(0)
2020	Varbergs BoIS	6	(0)
2021	IFK Malmö	13	(2)
2022	Clyde	6	(0)
2024–	Högaborgs BK		
- * Club domestic league appearances and goals as of 09:56, 8 May 2022

Samuel Monday Ayinoko Abu (born 12 November 1993), known as Monday Samuel, is a Nigerian and Swedish footballer who plays as a midfielder for Högaborgs BK.

Club	Season	Division	League		Svenska Cupen		Total	
Club	Season	Division	Apps	Goals	Apps	Goals	Apps	Goals
Ängelholms FF	2012	Superettan	9	1	0	0	9	1
Ängelholms FF	2013	Superettan	16	3	2	0	18	3
Ängelholms FF	2014	Superettan	28	7	3	1	31	8
Östersunds FK	2015	Superettan	3	0	0	0	3	0
Östersunds FK	2016	Allsvenskan	1	0	0	0	1	0
Career totals			57	11	5	1	62	12
