= Rasmus Rosenqvist =

Swedish footballer

Personal information
- Date of birth: 17 July 1996 (age 30)
- Place of birth: Sweden
- Height: 1.79 m (5 ft 10 in)
- Position: Midfielder

Youth career
- IF Elfsborg

Senior career*
Years	Team	Apps	(Gls)
2015–2020	IF Elfsborg	15	(0)
2018	→ Helsingborgs IF (loan)	5	(0)
2019	→ GAIS (loan)	19	(0)
- * Club domestic league appearances and goals as of 30 September 2020

Rasmus Rosenqvist (born 17 July 1997) is a Swedish footballer.
