= Tom Siwe =

Swedish footballer

Personal information
- Full name: Tom Olof Siwe
- Date of birth: 2 March 1987 (age 39)
- Place of birth: Jönköping, Sweden
- Positions: Right back; centre back

Team information
- Current team: Ljungskile SK
- Number: 11

Youth career
- IF Hagapojkarna
- –2004: IF Hallby
- 2005–2007: Heerenveen

Senior career*
Years	Team	Apps	(Gls)
2005	Husqvarna		
2007	Jong Heerenveen	0	(0)
2008–2019	Jönköpings Södra	260	(5)
2020–	Ljungskile SK	12	(0)

International career
2004	Sweden U17	4	(0)
2005	Sweden U18	3	(0)
2005–2006	Sweden U19	4	(0)
2007	Sweden U21	5	(0)
- * Club domestic league appearances and goals as of 20:37, 13 September 2020 (UTC)

Tom Olof Siwe (born 2 March 1987) is a Swedish professional footballer who plays for Ljungskile SK.

== Career ==
=== Club career ===
Siwe started his career at IF Hagapojkarna. He got his breakthrough in Husqvarna FF, where he came from IF Hallby. He was signed by Dutch club SC Heerenveen, where he only played for the clubs youth and reserve teams during the two and a half years he was in the club.

He returned to Sweden and during the summer 2008, he signed for Jönköpings Södra IF. Siwe made his debut for Södra on September 8, 2008 in a home game against BK Häcken (0-2). On 22 December 2010 he signed a new contract with Jönköping Södra for one year and with an option for one more. In November 2014, he extended his contract with the club for the 2015 season. Siwe made his Allsvenskan debut on April 2, 2016 in a 1-0 win against Kalmar FF. After the 2019 season, he left the club.

On January 12, 2020, Siwe was recruited by Ljungskile SK, where he signed a two-year contract.
