= Samuel Mensiro =

Ghanaian footballer

Personal information
- Full name: Samuel Laryea Mensiro
- Date of birth: 19 May 1989 (age 37)
- Place of birth: Ghana
- Height: 1.75 m (5 ft 9 in)
- Position: Defender

Youth career
- Right to Dream Academy
- Sporting Club Accra

Senior career*
Years	Team	Apps	(Gls)
2008–2009	Ledbury Town	24	(0)
2009–2010	Forest Green Rovers	0	(0)
2010–2011	Evesham United	21	(0)
2011–2013	Östersund	59	(0)
2014–2015	Örebro	9	(0)
2016–2023	Östersund	115	(2)
- * Club domestic league appearances and goals as of 5 August 2023

Samuel Mensiro (born 19 May 1989) is a Ghanaian footballer who plays as a defender.

Formerly known as Samuel Mensah, he changed his surname to Mensiro in 2016.

== Club career ==
=== England ===
Born in Labadi, Ghana and growing up in the capital city of Ghana, Mensiro began playing football when he was six years old and after joining Right to Dream Academy and Sporting Club Accra, he moved out his parents’ house to pursue his opportunity. He then moved to England as part a scholarship to attend Hartpury College in Hartpury, Gloucestershire. He combined his time there with playing in the English lower leagues, where he started his career at Ledbury Town and quickly make an impact for the side, making 24 appearances for the side. Prior to the move, Mensiro was linked to Premier League clubs, who were interested in signing him but failed to move because of the work permit issues.

It was reported on 5 August 2009 that Mensiro joined Forest Green Rovers. Shortly after the move, it was announced that Mensiro was given an all clear to play the club despite being on the student visa at the time. However, after making no appearances for the side, he joined Evesham United. Despite suffering injuries, Mensiro went on to make over 30 appearances for Evesham United. At the end of the 2010–11 season, Mensiro was offered a new contract by the club.

=== Östersunds FK ===
In the summer transfer window of 2011, Mensiro moved to Sweden by going on a trial at Östersunds FK and the trial was successful, leading him to sign a two–year contract. He then helped the side reach promotion to Division 1 Norra after winning Division 2 Norra in the 2011 season.

In the 2012 season, Mensiro continued to establish himself in the starting eleven for the side. He played in either the midfield or defensive positions during this seaspn. His performance began to attract interests from Sweden clubs in the summer transfer window, but managed to stay at the club. Despite missing one match, Mensiro helped the side reach promotion for the second time by winning the Division 1 Norra in the 2012 season, as he went on to make 26 appearances in all competitions.

At the start of the 2013 season, Mensiro started well when he set up a goal for Jamie Hopcutt to score the club's third goal of the game, in a 3–1 win over GAIS on 26 April 2013. After the match, he revealed that he was attacked by gangs. According to him, he said: " I understood that I could not ride a bike from them so I started running the bike. But in the end I threw the bike aside to run even faster. I got him into the house and they managed not to catch me. I was terribly afraid when I threw myself into the apartment and locked the door." Nevertheless, he continued to feature in the first team, but was soon sent–off for a foul on Modou Barrow, in a 3–1 loss against Varbergs BoIS on 18 May 2013. As a result, he served a two match suspension. Throughout the season, he continued to establish himself in the starting eleven for the side, where he played in either midfield positions and defender positions. At the end of the 2013 season, Mensiro went on to make 27 appearances in all competitions. For his performance, he was named Player of the Year.

=== Örebro SK ===
With his contract expiring at the end of the season, his future at Östersunds FK was uncertain and was keen on signing a new contract with the club. Instead, Mensiro joined Örebro SK on 19 November 2013, signing a two–year contract.

Mensiro made his Örebro SK debut in the opening game of the season, where he came on as a late substitute, in a 2–1 win over Halmstad. He quickly started in the first team, playing in the midfield position. However, he suffered a knee injury that sidelined for the rest of the season. Although he returned from injury in August, Mensiro remained out of the first team despite playing for the reserve side after his recovery. Nevertheless, he went on to make seven appearances for the side.

Mensiro made his first appearance of the 2015 season, where he started and played 59 minutes, in a 2–1 win over Dalkurd. He appeared the remaining matches for the Svenska Cupen, including the final against IFK Göteborg, which saw them lose 2–1. However, he remained as an unused substitute for the most for the seasons before being sidelined after suffering from chest pains. He then suffered a knee injury that sidelined much further for the rest of the season. At the end of the 2015 season, having made 2 appearances in all competitions, Mensiro was released by the club.

=== Östersunds FK (second spell) ===
It was announced on 25 November 2015 that Mensiro joined Östersunds FK for the second time in his career. Upon joining the club, he said he was happy to return to the club.

However, Mensiro spent the first two months on the substitute bench, due to his continuous recovery from his knee injury and competitions from Saman Ghoddos, Ronald Mukiibi and Ken Sema. Mensiro's first game after signing for the club in his second spell came on 15 May 2016, where he started the whole game, in a 2–0 win over IFK Göteborg. He later regained his first team place in and out this season, due to injuries. Mensiro later regained it as a centre–back later in the season. At the end of 2016 season, he went on to make 13 appearances in all competitions.

In the 2017 season, Mensah started the season with the club, playing in the defensive position. He then scored his first goal for Östersunds FK, in an opener against IFK Norrköping in the final of the Svenska Cupen, as they won 4–1 to qualify for the second qualifying round of the 2017–18 UEFA Europa League with manager Graham Potter. After the match, he explained his goal celebration following his middle finger gesture, which he described it as a "mistake", but nevertheless, enjoyed scoring his first goal for the club. However, he suffered an injury in a 2–1 loss against his former club Örebro SK on 16 April 2017 and was sidelined as a result. After returning from injury, Mensiro appeared as an unused substitute in numbers of matches before returning to start against Kalmar on 20 May 2017, in a 2–1 win. Shortly after his return, he quickly regained his first team place in number of matches, mostly playing in the centre–back and right–midfield position. Mensiro scored again this season on 16 July 2017, in a 2–1 win over Djurgården. Mensiro was part of the squad when he helped the side defeat the teams of Galatasaray, Fola Esch, and PAOK to secure the club's historic entry into the Europa League group stage. They finished second in their group, level on points with Athletic Bilbao. For his performance and display at the club this season, Mensiro signed a three–year contract with the club on 9 August 2017. At the end of the 2017, Mensiro finished the season, making 34 appearances (10 times in the UEFA Europa League) and scoring 2 times in all competitions. In addition, he went on to win the Right to Dream Player of the Year award for 2017.

In the 2018 season, Mensiro started the whole game in the round of 32 first leg of the UEFA Europa League, in a 3–0 loss against Arsenal. Although he appeared as an unused substitute in a follow-up leg, which saw Ostersunds FK beat Arsenal 2–1 at the Emirates Stadium, they exited the competition after losing 4–2 on aggregate. However, Mensiro spent the start of the season on the sidelines, due to his own injury concern and was placed on the substitute bench instead. It wasn't until on 18 April 2018 when he made his first appearance of the season, in a 1–1 draw against Kalmar FF.

== Personal life ==
Mensiro graduated from Hartpury College and Leeds Metropolitan University.

Mensiro is a Christian and credited God that he wouldn't be a footballer if it wasn't for him. Mensiro is married to his wife, Thilini Wester in 2013, having known each other since 2011. In addition, he speaks English and Swedish. In May 2016, Mensah changed his surname to Mensiro.

In June 2013, Mensiro was arrested on suspicion of rape, but was quickly released and was informed that no charges would be taken against him any further.

== Honours ==
Östersund

- Division 2 Norra: 2011
- Division 1 Norra: 2012
- Svenska Cupen: 2016–17
