= Sebastian Lundbäck =

Swedish footballer (born 1996)

Personal information
- Full name: Kim Olof Axel Sebastian Lundbäck
- Date of birth: 24 July 1996 (age 30)
- Height: 1.74 m (5 ft 9 in)
- Position: Midfielder

Team information
- Current team: IFK Östersund

Youth career
- Östersunds FK
- IFK Östersund

Senior career*
Years	Team	Apps	(Gls)
2013–2014	IFK Östersund	40	(5)
2014–2017	Östersunds FK	8	(0)
2015	→ IFK Östersund (loan)	3	(0)
2016	→ Team TG (loan)	11	(1)
2017	→ Team TG (loan)	9	(0)
2018	Team TG	23	(2)
2019	IFK Östersund	6	(0)
2022–	IFK Östersund	9	(0)

International career
- Sweden U17
- Sweden U18
2013–2014	Sweden U19	4	(0)
- * Club domestic league appearances and goals as of 16:14, 1 May 2023 (UTC)

Kim Olof Axel Sebastian Lundbäck (born 24 July 1996), known as Sebastian Lundbäck, is a Swedish footballer who plays as a midfielder for IFK Östersund.

== Club career ==
In 2014, following impressive performances in his native Sweden with IFK Östersund, Lundbäck was invited to trial with clubs across Europe. He had already played for Östersunds FK at youth level, but had rejected their contract offer in favour of IFK. However, in November of the same year, he decided to make the switch to Östersunds FK. The following season, he returned to IFK on loan, playing three times in the Division 2. He would be loaned out twice more by Östersunds FK, both to Team TG, before making the switch permanent for the 2018 season.

He returned to IFK in February 2019, signing a one-year deal with the club. He appears to have taken a break from football, before returning again to IFK in January 2022, this time signing a deal as a sporting director, while also being registered for the first team. He left his role as sporting director in October 2022, but continued to play for the first team.

== International career ==
Lundbäck has represented Sweden from under-17 to under-19 level.

== Personal life ==
His brother, Jonathan, is also a footballer, and the pair played together at numerous times during their careers.

== Career statistics ==
=== Club ===
As of 1 May 2023.

Appearances and goals by club, season and competition
Club	Season	League			Cup		Other		Total	
Club	Season	Division	Apps	Goals	Apps	Goals	Apps	Goals	Apps	Goals
IFK Östersund	2013	Division 3	18	2	1 (Note: Appearances in the Svenska Cupen)	0	0	0	19	2
IFK Östersund	2014	Division 2	22	3	0	0	0	0	22	3
IFK Östersund	Total		40	5	1	0	0	0	41	5
Östersunds FK	2015	Superettan	7	0	1	0	0	0	8	0
Östersunds FK	2016	Allsvenskan	0	0	1	0	0	0	1	0
Östersunds FK	2017	Allsvenskan	1	0	0	0	0	0	1	0
Östersunds FK	Total		8	0	2	0	0	0	10	0
IFK Östersund (loan)	2015	Division 2	3	0	0	0	0	0	3	0
Team TG (loan)	2016	Ettan	11	1	0	0	0	0	11	1
Team TG (loan)	2017	Ettan	9	0	0	0	0	0	9	0
Team TG	2018	Ettan	23	2	2	0	0	0	25	2
Team TG	Total		43	3	2	0	0	0	45	3
IFK Östersund	2019	Division 3	6	0	0	0	0	0	6	0
IFK Östersund	2022	Division 2	6	0	1	0	0	0	7	0
IFK Östersund	2023	Division 2	3	0	0	0	0	0	3	0
IFK Östersund	Total		15	0	1	0	0	0	16	0
Career total			109	8	6	0	0	0	115	8
