= Doug Bergqvist =

Swedish footballer

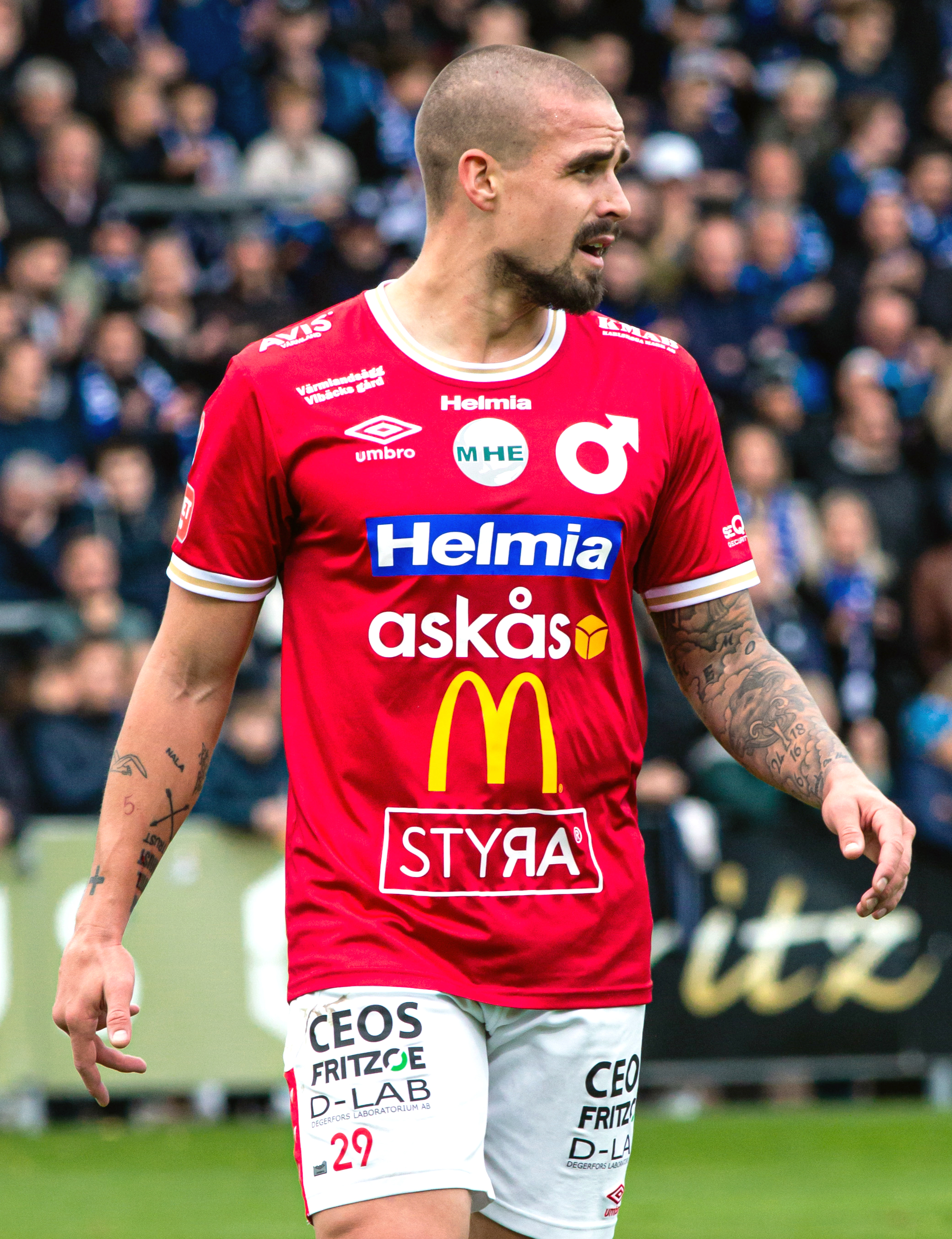
- Bergqvist in October 2023

Personal information
- Full name: Jan Douglas Bergqvist
- Date of birth: 29 March 1993 (age 33)
- Place of birth: Stockholm, Sweden
- Position: Centre back

Team information
- Current team: Värnamo
- Number: 5

Youth career
- Reading
- Queens Park Rangers
- 2009–2010: Aldershot Town

Senior career*
Years	Team	Apps	(Gls)
2010–2013	Aldershot Town	7	(0)
2010–2011	→ Thatcham Town (loan)		
2011	→ Dorchester Town (loan)	8	(0)
2011–2012	→ Farnborough (loan)	32	(2)
2012	→ Basingstoke Town (loan)	5	(0)
2013	→ Staines Town (loan)	4	(0)
2013–2014	Exeter City	0	(0)
2013–2014	→ Welling United (loan)	18	(2)
2014–2019	Östersund	107	(3)
2019	→ Haugesund (loan)	21	(1)
2020	Arka Gdynia	6	(0)
2020–2021	Kalmar FF	35	(1)
2022–2023	Chornomorets Odesa	0	(0)
2022	→ Kalmar FF (loan)	10	(0)
2022	→ Riga (loan)	12	(0)
2023	→ Auda (loan)	15	(2)
2023	Degerfors	10	(0)
2024–2025	Karviná	20	(0)
2025	Sellier & Bellot Vlašim	8	(1)
2026–	Värnamo	21	(0)
- * Club domestic league appearances and goals as of 12 November 2026

Jan Douglas Bergqvist (born 29 March 1993) is a Swedish professional footballer who plays as a centre-back for Superettan club Värnamo.

== Career ==
Born in Stockholm, Bergqvist moved with his family to England when he was seven years old. He played youth football with Reading and Queens Park Rangers, before joining Aldershot Town in 2009. Bergqvist eventually became youth team captain at Aldershot, and spent loan spells at both Thatcham Town and Dorchester Town, before making his senior debut for Aldershot in May 2011. He joined Farnborough on loan in August 2011, and Basingstoke Town in October 2012.

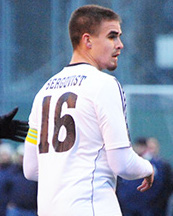

Bergqvist signed for Exeter City in June 2013, before moving on loan to Welling United a few days later, for the whole of the 2013–14 season.

On 10 February 2014, Bergqvist left England to return to Sweden, signing a two-year contract with Östersund on a free transfer. He did so as part of a scheme called 'League Football Education' which aims to obtain contracts abroad for players in the English league system, alongside Andrew Mills and Jamie Hopcutt.

On 27 March 2019, Bergqvist joined Eliteserien side Haugesund on loan until 31 July with an option to make the deal permanent.

In February 2020 he moved to Polish club Arka Gdynia.

After playing in Sweden with Kalmar FF, he signed for Ukrainian club Chornomorets Odesa in January 2022. He returned to Kalmar FF on loan in March due to 2022 Russian invasion of Ukraine. After the loan spell ended he moved to Latvian club Riga FC.

In July 2023 he signed for Degerfors.

On 2 March 2024, Bergqvist signed a contract with Czech First League club Karviná.

== Career statistics ==
As of 9 February 2019

Appearances and goals by club, season and competition
Club	Season	League			National cup (Note: Includes FA Cup, Svenska Cupen)		Other		Total	
Club	Season	Division	Apps	Goals	Apps	Goals	Apps	Goals	Apps	Goals
Aldershot Town	2010–11	Football League Two	1	0	0	0	0	0	1	0
Aldershot Town	2011–12	Football League Two	2	0	0	0	0	0	2	0
Aldershot Town	2012–13	Football League Two	4	0	1	0	0	0	5	0
Aldershot Town	Total		7	0	1	0	0	0	8	0
Dorchester Town (loan)	2010–11	Conference South	3	0	0	0	0	0	3	0
Farnborough (loan)	2011–12	Conference South	32	2	0	0	0	0	32	2
Basingstoke Town (loan)	2012–13	Conference South	5	0	0	0	0	0	5	0
Exeter City	2013–14	Football League Two	0	0	0	0	0	0	0	0
Welling United (loan)	2013–14	Conference Premier	18	2	0	0	0	0	18	2
Östersund	2014	Superettan	26	0	3	0	—		29	0
Östersund	2015	Superettan	25	2	0	0	—		25	2
Östersund	2016	Allsvenskan	23	0	1	0	—		24	0
Östersund	2017	Allsvenskan	10	1	1	0	4 (Note: Appearances in UEFA Europa League)	0	15	1
Östersund	2018	Allsvenskan	23	0	0	0	—		23	0
Östersund	Total		107	3	5	0	4	0	116	3
Career total			172	7	6	0	4	0	182	7

== Honours ==
Östersund

- Svenska Cupen: 2016–17
