= Haraldur Björnsson =

Icelandic footballer

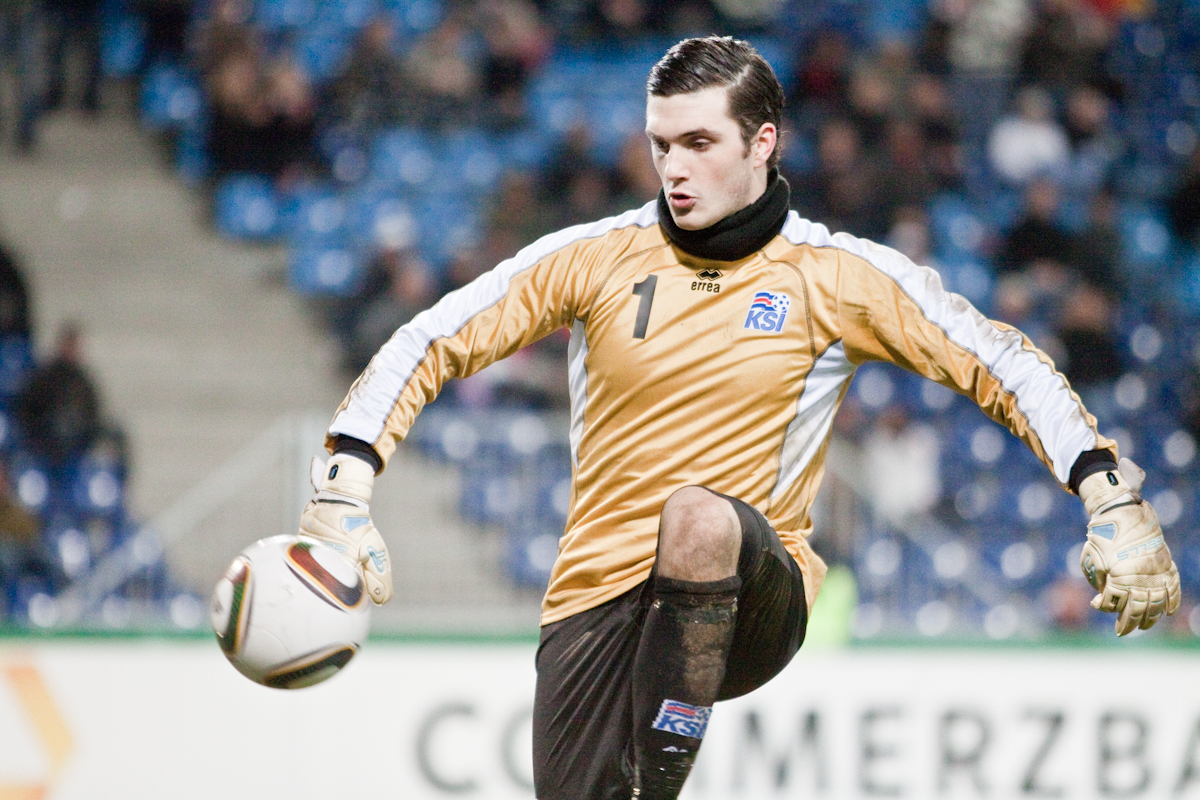

Personal information
- Date of birth: 11 January 1989 (age 37)
- Place of birth: Reykjavík, Iceland
- Height: 1.92 m (6 ft 4 in)
- Position: Goalkeeper

Team information
- Current team: Stjarnan
- Number: 1

Youth career
- –2005: Valur
- 2005–2008: Hearts

Senior career*
Years	Team	Apps	(Gls)
2009–2011	Valur	29	(0)
2010	→ Þróttur Reykjavík (loan)	22	(0)
2012–2014	Sarpsborg 08 FF	22	(0)
2013	→ Fredrikstad FK (loan)	12	(0)
2014	→ Strømmen IF (loan)	16	(0)
2014–2016	Östersunds FK	9	(0)
2016	Lillestrøm	1	(0)
2017–	Stjarnan	127	(0)

International career
2005	Iceland U16	3	(0)
2005	Iceland U17	3	(0)
2006	Iceland U18	2	(0)
2007–2011	Iceland U21	19	(0)
2016–	Iceland	1	(0)
- * Club domestic league appearances and goals as of 18 April 2023

Haraldur Björnsson (born 11 January 1989) is an Icelandic footballer who plays for Stjarnan and the Iceland national football team as a goalkeeper. He was the starting goalkeeper for Iceland U21 at the 2011 UEFA European Under-21 Championship. Björnsson earned his first cap for the senior national side on 13 January 2016, in the 1:0 win over Finland in a friendly match, substituting Ingvar Jónsson at the half-time mark.

Club	Season	Division	League		Cup		Total	
Club	Season	Division	Apps	Goals	Apps	Goals	Apps	Goals
Valur	2009	Úrvalsdeild	9	0	1	0	10	0
Thróttur Reykjavík (loan)	2010	1. deild karla	22	0	4	0	26	0
Valur	2011	Úrvalsdeild	20	0	2	0	22	0
Sarpsborg 08 FF	2012	Norwegian First Division	22	0	0	0	22	0
Fredrikstad FK (loan)	2013	Norwegian First Division	12	0	0	0	12	0
Strømmen IF (loan)	2014	Norwegian First Division	16	0	1	0	17	0
Östersunds FK	2014	Superettan	2	0	1	0	3	0
Östersunds FK	2015	Superettan	7	0	1	0	8	0
Östersunds FK	2016	Allsvenskan	0	0	2	0	2	0
Lillestrøm SK	2016	Tippeligaen	1	0	0	0	1	0
Stjarnan	2017	Úrvalsdeild	18	0	2	0	20	0
Stjarnan	2018	Úrvalsdeild	22	0	5	0	27	0
Stjarnan	2019	Úrvalsdeild	22	0	2	0	24	0
Career totals			173	0	21	0	194	0
