= Curtis Edwards =

English footballer

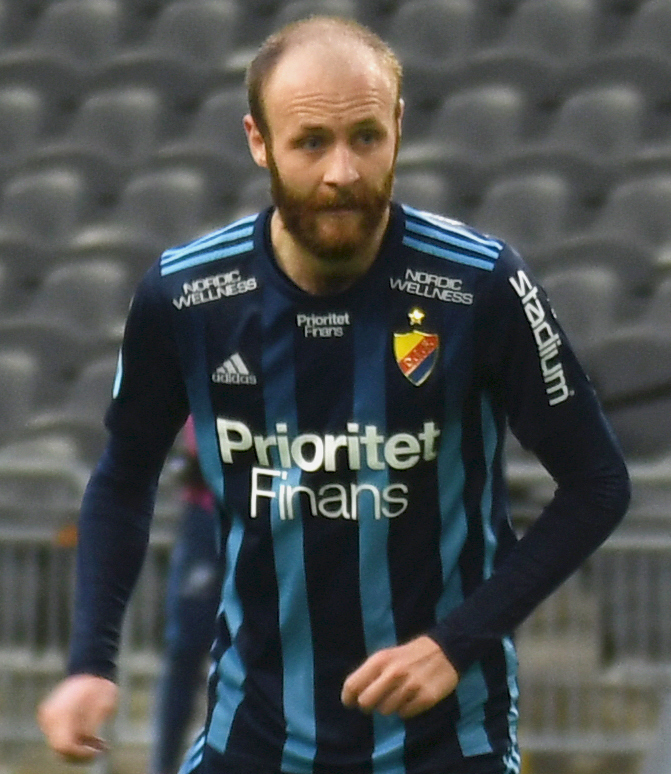
- Edwards playing for Djurgården

Personal information
- Full name: Curtis Garry Edwards
- Date of birth: 12 January 1994 (age 32)
- Place of birth: Middlesbrough, England
- Height: 1.83 m (6 ft 0 in)
- Position: Midfielder

Team information
- Current team: Östersund
- Number: 17

Youth career
- Thornaby
- 2006–2013: Middlesbrough

Senior career*
Years	Team	Apps	(Gls)
2013	Darlington 1883		
2013–2014	Thornaby		
2014	Spennymoor Town		
2014–2015	Thornaby		
2015	Ytterhogdal	10	(3)
2015–2016	Thornaby		
2016	Ytterhogdal	10	(6)
2016–2019	Östersund	81	(13)
2019–2022	Djurgården	44	(4)
2022–2024	Stabæk	55	(3)
2024	Woking	17	(1)
2024–2025	Notts County	17	(0)
2025–2026	Gateshead	18	(0)
2026–	Östersund	29	(5)
- * Club domestic league appearances and goals as of 11 November 2026

Curtis Garry Edwards (born 12 January 1994) is an English professional footballer who plays as a midfielder for Östersund.

== Club career ==
=== Early Career in England ===
Born in Middlesbrough, England, Edwards started his football career at Thornaby before joining the Middlesbrough academy when he was twelve. Soon after, Edwards signed a scholarship and a three–year professional contract. However, in March 2013, he was released by the academy system.

Following his release by the club, Edwards went on a trial at Birmingham City, Bristol City, Hartlepool United and Hibernian but were unsuccessful, leading him to drift away from football. In September 2013, he joined Darlington. He made his Darlington debut on 19 September 2013, in a 3–1 win over Harton & Westoe in the Durham Challenge Cup. By the end of October, he made ten appearances for the side. Despite performing well for the side in a number of matches, Edwards soon lost his first team place.

Despite signing an 18 months contract with Darlington, Edwards joined Thornaby in late–December, where his father, Paul, was the club's assistant manager. He quickly impressed on his debut on 29 December 2013, in a 4–0 win over Seaham Red Star. Edwards then scored his first goal for the club on 11 January 2014, in a 6–3 win over Tow Law Town.

In February 2014, Edwards joined Spennymoor Town. Two months later, he re–joined Thornaby. A few days later, he quickly scored on his return for the side, in a 5–3 win over Brandon United. He started well in the 2014–15 season, scoring against Seaham Red Star, Heaton Stannington, Billingham Town (three times), Team Northumbria, Stokesley Sports Club and Chester-le-Street Town. He went on to help the side seventh place in the league, as he scored eight times in the 2014–15 season.

Throughout his early career at England, Edwards acknowledged that he didn't really give it his all at Darlington and Spennymoor and became distracted by going to night clubs and parties.

=== Ytterhogdals IK ===
In July 2015, Edwards moved abroad for the first time in his career when he joined Ytterhogdal, a club based in central Sweden playing in fifth tier Division 3. The move came after Brian Wake invited him to a trial where he made an impression, leading him to sign for the club. During his first spell at Ytterhogdals IK, he scored three times in ten appearances for the side.

In October 2015, Edwards returned to Thornaby for a third time. In that time he scored against Heaton Stannington.

In February 2016, Edwards, returned to Sweden when he re–joined Ytterhogdals IK. Upon returning to the club, he continued to produce his goalscoring form, scoring six times in ten appearances, including a hat–trick against Team TG FF on 22 June 2016. He later reflected upon playing in Sweden saying that he wanted to play again and that he worked hard to take advantage of the opportunity to play abroad.

=== Östersunds FK ===
Edwards joined Östersund in the summer of 2016 from third division (i.e. a Tier 5 of the Swedish league) side Ytterhogdal. It came after when he went on a trial following a recommendation from Brian Wake and impressed the side in a friendly match.

Edwards made his Östersunds FK debut on 6 August 2016, where he started the whole game and set up one of the goals, in a 4–0 win over GIF Sundsvall. After making his debut, he said: "I did not expect this, I have and continues to amaze myself, I refused to identify me in that, it was not the life I wanted so I started playing again". For his performance, he was named Team of the Week. He then scored two goals between 28 August 2016 and 11 September 2016 against BK Häcken and Helsingborg. Since making his debut for the club, Edwards quickly established himself in the starting eleven for the side. At the end of the 2016 season, as the club finished eighth place, Edwards made thirteen appearances and scoring three times in all competitions.

In the 2017 season, Edwards started the whole game against IFK Norrköping in the final of the Svenska Cupen, as they won 4–1 to qualify for the second qualifying round of the 2017–18 UEFA Europa League with manager Graham Potter. Throughout April, he scored three times, including a brace against AFC Eskilstuna. A week later, on 7 May 2017, Edwards played a role when he set up two goals, in a 2–1 win over Hammarby. Since the start of the season, he continued to retained his first team place, playing at the right midfield position and making an impression in a number of matches for the side. By late–May, Edwards began playing in the right–back position for the next four matches. Throughout the rest of the 2017 season, Edwards began playing in various positions in defence and midfield. Edwards was part of the squad when he helped the side defeat the teams of Galatasaray, Fola Esch, and PAOK (in which he scored the opening goal of the game) to secure the club's historic entry into the Europa League group stage.

Elsewhere, during the club's attempt to reach the UEFA Europa League Group Stage, he was sent–off for a second bookable offence, in a 3–0 loss against AIK on 20 August 2017. In the UEFA Europa League Group Stage, Edwards started for the side, where he played as a right–back position, in a 2–0 win over Zorya Luhansk on Matchday 1. In Matchday 3 against Athletic Bilbao, he scored the club's second goal of the game, in a 2–2 draw. Then in Matchday 4 against Zorya Luhansk, Edwards played a role that led to an own goal from Dmytro Hrechyshkin, in a 2–0 win, a win that send the club to the knockout phase of the UEFA Europa League. They finished second in their group, level on points with Athletic Bilbao. At the end of the 2017 season, Edwards made forty–three appearances and scoring five times in all competitions.

In the 2018 season, Edwards started the whole game in the round of 32 both legs of the UEFA Europa League against Arsenal, as they lost 4–2 on aggregate and eliminated from the competition. Then, on 15 April 2018, he scored his first goal of the season, in a 2–1 win over IFK Göteborg. He started the season, playing in either defensive midfield and right midfield positions. Edwards scored two goals between 19 May 2018 and 23 May 2018 against GIF Sundsvall and IK Sirius. For the rest of the 2018 season, Edwards continued to play in various positions in defence and midfield. He then scored added three more goals as the season progressed. At the end of the 2018 season, Edwards went on to make thirty–six appearances and scoring three times in all competitions.

In the 2019 season, Edwards started the season well when he set up two goals, in a 3–2 win over Falkenberg on 7 April 2019. In a match against Elfsborg on 19 April 2019, he scored his first goal of the season, in a 1–1 draw. He continued to feature in the first team for the side until he suffered a knee injury that saw him miss one match. Edwards made his return to the starting lineup from injury, starting the whole game, in a 4–0 loss against Hammarby on 14 May 2019. He continued to regain his first team place for the side until his departure from the club. By the time he departed the club, Edwards made fourteen appearances and scoring once for the side.

=== Djurgårdens IF ===
It was announced that Edwards joined Djurgården on a three-and-a-half-year contract on 31 July 2019. It came after when Allsvenskan clubs were interested in signing him upon expiry of his contract in the summer.

Edwards scored on his debut for Djurgårdens IF, in a 4–0 win over IK Sirius on 10 August 2019. Edwards then played against his former club, Östersunds FK on 30 September 2019, where he received a standing ovation from supporters. Since making his debut, he quickly established himself in the starting eleven for the side in the midfield position. Edwards helped the side win the league for the first time since 2005 after drawing 2–2 against IFK Norrköping in the last game of the season, with a draw to win the league against title contenders, Malmö and Hammarby. At the end of the 2019 season, Edwards finished with twelve appearances and scored once for Djurgårdens IF.

=== Stabæk ===
On 13 February 2022, Edwards joined Norwegian First Division side Stabæk on a two-year deal.

=== Woking ===
On 1 February 2024, Edwards returned to England to join National League club, Woking on a deal until the end of the 2023–24 campaign.

=== Notts County ===
On 26 June 2024, Edwards joined EFL League One club Notts County on a two-year contract.

On 3 September 2025, he departed the club after the mutual termination of his contract.

=== Gateshead ===
On 5 September 2025, Edwards joined National League club Gateshead.

=== Return to Östersunds ===
On 15 February 2026, Edwards' former club Östersund launched a crowdfunding campaign to help bring the midfielder back to the club. Four days later, Gateshead announced he had left the club via mutual consent. On 22 February 2026, he officially rejoined Östersund, signing a two-year deal.

== Career statistics ==
As of match played 20 January 2026

Appearances and goals by club, season and competition
Club	Season	League			FA Cup		EFL Cup		Other		Total	
Club	Season	Division	Apps	Goals	Apps	Goals	Apps	Goals	Apps	Goals	Apps	Goals
Darlington 1883	2013–14	Northern Premier League Division One North	Season statistics not known									
Thornaby	2013–14	Northern League Division Two	Season statistics not known									
Spennymoor Town	2013–14	Northern League Division One	Season statistics not known									
Thornaby	2013–14	Northern League Division Two	Season statistics not known									
Thornaby	2014–15	Northern League Division Two	Season statistics not known									
Ytterhogdal	2015	Division 3	10	3	0	0	—		—		10	3
Thornaby	2015–16	Northern League Division Two	Season statistics not known									
Ytterhogdal	2016	Division 3	10	6	1	3	—		—		11	9
Östersund	2016	Allsvenskan	18	3	6	0	—		—		24	3
Östersund	2017	Allsvenskan	27	3	6	1	—		11 (Note: Appearance(s) in UEFA Europa League)	1	44	5
Östersund	2018	Allsvenskan	29	7	4	0	—		—		33	7
Östersund	2019	Allsvenskan	14	1	0	0	—		—		14	1
Östersund	Total		88	14	16	1	—		11	1	115	16
Djurgården	2019	Allsvenskan	12	1	4	0	—		—		16	1
Djurgården	2020	Allsvenskan	25	3	6	1	—		3 (Note: One appearance in UEFA Champions League, two in UEFA Europa League)	1	34	5
Djurgården	2021	Allsvenskan	7	0	1	0	—		—		8	0
Djurgården	Total		44	4	11	1	—		3	1	58	6
Stabæk	2022	First Division	27	1	3	0	—		—		30	1
Stabæk	2023	Eliteserien	28	2	0	0	—		—		28	2
Stabæk	Total		55	3	3	0	—		—		58	3
Woking	2023–24	National League	17	1	—		—		—		17	1
Notts County	2024–25	League Two	16	0	0	0	1	0	0	0	17	0
Notts County	2025–26	League Two	1	0	0	0	0	0	0	0	1	0
Notts County	Total		17	0	0	0	1	0	0	0	18	0
Gateshead	2025–26	National League	18	0	2	0	—		3 (Note: Two appearances in National League Cup, one in FA Trophy)	0	23	0
Career total			259	31	33	5	1	0	17	2	310	38

== Personal life ==
Edwards has a brother, Kieran, who is a former England youth international footballer, and were teammates during Curtis' time at Thornaby. His father, Paul, was the club's assistant manager and eventually as a Manager of Thornaby during Curtis' time as well. He also has two sisters. During his early football career, he worked on a construction sites with his father. Edwards was even about to start a two-year apprenticeship in construction just before joining Ytterhogdals IK.

In August 2013, Edwards was fined a total of £470 for driving a car without a license after becoming involved in a car accident. Since moving to Sweden, Edwards began taking lessons to learn the Swedish language and has settled down in the country, with his Swedish girlfriend.

== Honours ==
Östersund

- Svenska Cupen: 2016–17

Djurgården

- Allsvenskan: 2019
