= Michael Omoh =

Nigerian footballer

Personal information
- Full name: Michael Junior Omoh
- Date of birth: 29 August 1991 (age 35)
- Place of birth: Warri, Nigeria
- Height: 1.83 m (6 ft 0 in)
- Position: Midfielder

Team information
- Current team: CSM Alexandria
- Number: 29

Youth career
- –2008: Mowoe Babes
- 2008–2010: Gateway

Senior career*
Years	Team	Apps	(Gls)
2011–2014	Dalkurd	90	(28)
2015–2016	Östersund	34	(6)
2016–2019	Örebro	76	(3)
2019	→ Mjällby (loan)	13	(3)
2020	Politehnica Iași	18	(4)
2020–2021	Hapoel Kfar Saba	15	(1)
2021	Maccabi Ahi Nazareth	15	(3)
2021–2022	Academica Clinceni	18	(1)
2022	Farul Constanța	12	(2)
2022–2023	Kazma		
2023	Liaoning Shenyang	17	(0)
2024–	CSM Alexandria	9	(0)
- * Club domestic league appearances and goals as of 11 May 2024

Michael Junior Omoh (born 29 August 1991) is a Nigerian professional footballer who plays as a midfielder for Liga II club CSM Alexandria.

== Club career ==
In the summer of 2019 Omoh moved from first league side Örebro SK to Swedish second league club Mjällby AIF.

== Honours ==
Mjällby

- Superettan: 2019
