= Johan Bertilsson =

Swedish footballer

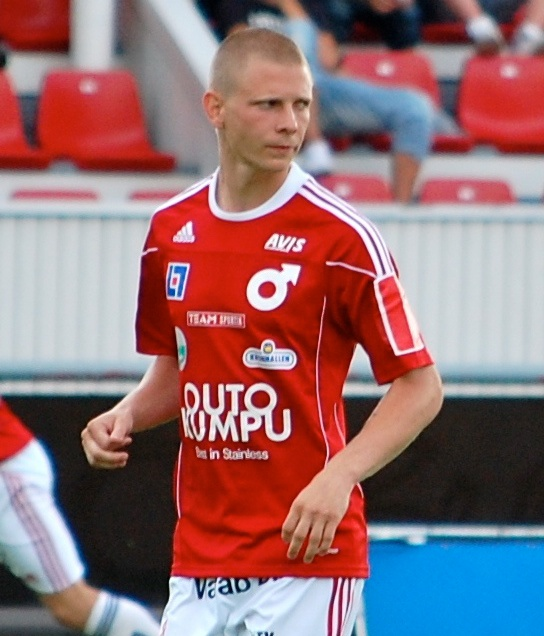

Personal information
- Full name: Karl Johan Walter Bertilsson
- Date of birth: 15 February 1988 (age 38)
- Place of birth: Hova, Sweden
- Height: 1.77 m (5 ft 9 1/2 in)
- Position: Midfielder

Youth career
- Hova

Senior career*
Years	Team	Apps	(Gls)
2004	Hova		
2004–2006	Carlstad United	45	(5)
2007–2010	Degerfors	75	(18)
2010–2014	Kalmar	28	(2)
2012	→ J-Södra (loan)	13	(1)
2013	→ Degerfors (loan)	28	(16)
2014	Zagłębie Lubin	7	(0)
2014	Zagłębie Lubin II	2	(0)
2014–2016	Gefle	82	(23)
2017	Östersund	26	(11)
2018	Dalkurd	5	(0)
2018–2019	Örebro	41	(6)
2019	→ Örebro U21	1	(0)
2020–2022	Degerfors	87	(28)
2024	IF Karlstad	18	(3)
2025	FBK Karlstad	7	(2)

International career
2003–2005	Sweden U17	16	(5)
2005–2006	Sweden U19	9	(1)
- * Club domestic league appearances and goals as of 1 January 2026

Johan Bertilsson (born 15 February 1988) is a Swedish footballer who played as a midfielder.

== Honours ==
Östersunds

- Svenska Cupen: 2016–17
