= Jamie Hopcutt =

English footballer

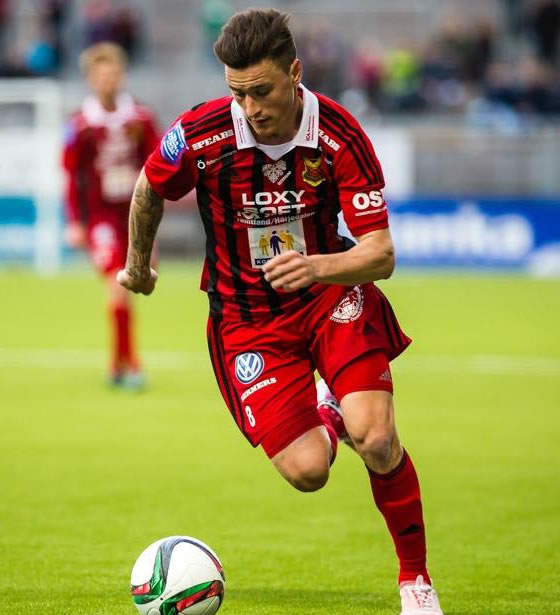
- Hopcutt with Östersund in 2015

Personal information
- Full name: Jamie Ryan Hopcutt
- Date of birth: 23 June 1992 (age 34)
- Place of birth: York, England
- Height: 1.80 m (5 ft 11 in)
- Position: Attacking midfielder

Team information
- Current team: Forte Virtus
- Number: 8

Youth career
- –2010: York City

Senior career*
Years	Team	Apps	(Gls)
2010	York City	0	(0)
2010	→ Whitby Town (loan)		
2010	→ Stokesley (loan)		
2010–2011	Ossett Town		
2011	Tadcaster Albion		
2012–2019	Östersund	167	(44)
2020	GIF Sundsvall	14	(3)
2021	Hapoel Kfar Saba	10	(0)
2021–2022	Oldham Athletic	16	(1)
2022–2023	IFK Mariehamn	32	(6)
2024–2026	Östersund	45	(8)
2026–	Forte Virtus	0	(0)
- * Club domestic league appearances and goals as of 09:44, 23 February 2026 (UTC)

Jamie Ryan Hopcutt (born 23 June 1992) is an English professional footballer who plays as an attacking midfielder for Forte Virtus.

Regarding his playing style, Hopcutt was described as a "creative midfielder that can score goals, athletic with good balance and close ball control."

== Club career ==
=== Early career in England ===
Born in York, England, Hopcutt started his career at York City and progressed through the club's system, leading him to sign a scholarship in May 2008 and as a youth player. Over the next years, he was a youth player, where he was featured regularly and scoring for the youth team, playing as a winger.

In May 2010, Hopcutt signed a short–term with the club on a non-contract terms. He was sent on one-month loans in August and September 2010 to Whitby Town and Stokesley.

Hopcutt was released in 2010, and signed for Ossett Town.

Hopcutt left Ossett Town in 2011 and signed for Northern Counties East League side Tadcaster Albion. He reflected about his time playing in non-league football, that it made him fed up playing the game.

=== Östersunds FK ===
In December 2011, Hopcutt signed for Swedish third tier side Östersund as part of a scheme called 'League Football Education' which aims to obtain contracts abroad for players in the English league system, alongside Andrew Mills and Doug Bergqvist. It came after when he was spotted by manager Graham Potter following his hat–trick performance during a trial day at Warwick University and invited him to Sweden, leading him to make an impression, which was enough to be signed by the club on a three-month deal.

==== 2012 season ====
Hopcutt made his Östersunds FK debut, where he started the whole game, in a 1–1 draw against IK Sirius in the opening game of the season. Since joining the club, he began playing in the "more central number nine or ten role" under Manager Potter. It wasn't until on 26 May 2012 when Hopcutt scored his first goal for the club, in a 4–0 win over Syrianska. He later scored two more goals later in the 2012 season. Hopcutt later helped the side reach promotion for the second time by winning the Division 1 Norra in the 2012 season, as he went on to make twenty–five appearances and scoring three times in all competitions. For his performance throughout the season, Hopcutt was named the club's Best Player of the Season. At the end of the 2012 season, they soon extended his contract for the rest of the season and during the winter they extended it yet again for two additional years.

==== 2013 season ====
In the 2013 season, Hopcutt started the season, playing in the central midfield position. On 26 April 2013, he then scored his first goal of the season, in a 3–1 win against GAIS, followed up by scoring twice, in a 5–0 win over Jönköpings Södra. By June, he was soon out of the starting lineup and appeared in a number of matches as a substitute. Despite this, Hopcutt set up two goals, after coming on as a substitute, just 13 minutes left to the game, for Taylor Morgan, who's also came on as a substitute, in a 3–0 win over Varbergs BoIS on 14 September 2013. Then, on 30 September 2013, he ended his six months goal drought without scoring when he scored in a 1–1 draw against Örebro. For the next four matches towards the end of the 2013 season, Hopcutt scored two more times for the side. During which, Hopcutt once played in the right–back position on 6 October 2013, in a 1–1 draw against Örgryte. At the end of the 2013 season, he went on to make thirty appearances and scoring six times in all competitions.

==== 2014 season ====
However, at the start of the 2014 season, Hopcutt missed the first four matches of the season, due to a back injury. It wasn't until on 3 May 2014 when he made his return from injury, where he came on as a substitute, in a 3–0 win over Varbergs BoIS. On 17 May 2014, Hopcutt scored his first goals of the season, scoring twice in a 2–2 draw against Degerfors. This was followed up by scoring against GAIS. His goalscoring form continued in early–June, scoring against Öster and Hammarby. For his good performance since returning from injury, Hopcutt signed a new contract with Östersunds FK during the same month. Despite facing sidelined on two occasions towards the end of the season, Hopcutt went on to make twenty–five appearances and scoring nine times in all competitions.

==== 2015 season ====
In the 2015 season, Hopcutt missed the start of the season, due to an injury. It wasn't until on 5 May 2015 when he made his return from injury as a substitute, in a 4–1 win over Syrianska. This was followed up by scoring his first goal of the season five days later, in a 2–1 win over AFC United. After missing one match, he scored on his return on 20 May 2015, in a 3–2 win over Assyriska and scored one week later, on 3 June 2015, in another 3–2 win over Degerfors. Halfway through the 2015 Superettan season newspaper Aftonbladet ranked him as the tenth best player in the league while Östersunds-Posten listed him as the fifth best Östersunds FK player of all time. Then, on 18 July 2015, he scored his fourth goal of the season, as well as, setting up one of the goals, in a 3–0 win over IK Frej, followed up by scoring twice against Varbergs BoIS seven days later, in a 4–1 win. A month later, on 24 August 2015, Hopcutt scored a hat–trick (and his first Östersunds FK's career), in a 5–1 win over Utsikten. Towards the end of the 2015 season, he scored five more goals in the last four matches against GAIS (twice), Jönköpings Södra, Syrianska and Ljungskile. His goal against Syrianska saw Östersund secured promotion to the Swedish top flight, Allsvenskan, for the first time in their history following a second-place finish in the 2015 Superettan. After the match, he said the promotion was dedicated to his family and his girlfriend. For his performance, Hopcutt was awarded Superettan's Player of the Year. At the end of the 2015 season, he went on to make twenty–four appearances and scoring fifteen times (becoming the second top–scorer in the league, just two goals behind Fredrik Olsson) in all competitions.

==== 2016 season ====
On 4 April 2016, Hopcutt made his first ever appearance in the Allsvenskan, coming on as a 58th-minute substitute for Gabriel Somi. In the 82nd minute of the game, Hopcutt suffered a double fracture of his tibia. Initially out until August, he was effectively ruling him out for the rest of the season. He previously suffered a hip injury earlier this year but later made a full recovery. He only made two appearances at the end of the 2016 season. At the end of the 2016 season, Hopcutt signed a three–year contract with the club.

==== 2017 season ====
At the start of the 2017 season, Hopcutt continued to recovery from tibia injury and his recovery was delayed beyond January. It wasn't until on 13 April 2017 when he made his first appearance of the season, coming on as a late substitute, against IFK Norrköping in the final of the Svenska Cupen, as they won 4–1 to qualify for the second qualifying round of the 2017–18 UEFA Europa League with manager Graham Potter. Between 26 April 2017 and 7 May 2017, Hopcutt scored four times in three matches against AFC Eskilstuna, IF Elfsborg (twice) and Hammarby. However, in a follow-up match against Malmö on 14 May 2017, he was sent–off for a straight red card following a push on Franz Brorsson, who was also sent–off as well, as Östersunds FK lost 2–1. After serving a two match suspension, Hopcutt then scored his fifth goal of the season on 3 June 2017, in a 3–1 win over GIF Sundsvall. In the summer transfer of 2017, Hopcutt was linked a move to Wolverhampton Wanderers but the move never happened. Amid the transfer speculation, Hopcutt remained at the club and scored on his European debut, in a 2–0 win against Galatasaray on 13 July 2017. After beating Galatasary in the return leg, Hopcutt was part of the squad when he helped the side defeat the teams of Fola Esch, and PAOK (in which he set up a goal for Saman Ghoddos) to secure the club's historic entry into the Europa League group stage. Hopcutt spent the rest of the 2017 season, starting for the side in the number of matches. At the end of the 2017 season, he went on to make twenty–eight appearances and scoring six times in all competitions.

==== 2018 season ====
In the 2018 season, Hopcutt played in both legs in the round of 32 both legs of the UEFA Europa League against Arsenal, as they lost 4–2 on aggregate and eliminated from the competition. Four days later, on 26 February 2018, he scored his first goal of the season, in a 2–0 win over Åtvidaberg. He started of the 2018 season when he started in a number of matches as a centre–forward position. After suffering an injury that kept him out throughout April and mid–May, Hopcutt scored on his return on 23 May 2018, in a 5–2 win over IK Sirius. This was followed up by scoring in a 2–0 win over BK Häcken three days later. He, again, scored two goals in two matches between 21 July 2018 and 28 July 2018 against Trelleborg and IF Elfsborg. His next goal came on 5 October 2018, in a 2–0 win over Dalkurd. At the end of the 2018 season, Hopcutt went on to make thirty appearances and scoring six times in all competitions.

==== 2019 season ====
After only scoring once for the 2019 season, his only goal coming on 29 April 2019 in a 3–0 win over Helsingborg, Hopcutt's ÖFK contract expired at the end of the season and he departed the club after eight years.

=== GIF Sundsvall ===
On 19 August 2020, Hopcutt joined Superettan side GIF Sundsvall on a two-and-a-half-year deal. He left the club at the end of the 2020 season.

=== Hapoel Kfar Saba ===
In February 2021, Hopcutt left Sweden for the first time since 2012 to join Israeli Premier League side Hapoel Kfar Saba on an 18-month deal.

=== Oldham Athletic ===
On 13 August 2021, it was confirmed that Hopcutt was returning to England to sign for League Two side Oldham Athletic on a one-year contract with an option for a further year. He made his debut for the club a day later in a 2–1 defeat away to Bradford City. Hopcutt was released at the end of the 2021–22 following relegation.

=== IFK Mariehamn ===
In the summer 2022, Hopcutt moved to Finland after signing with Veikkausliiga side IFK Mariehamn. On 3 January 2023, his deal was extended for the 2023 season.

=== Return to Östersunds FK ===
In February 2024, Hopcutt returned to Östersunds FK on a two-year deal.

==== 2024 season ====
It took Hopcutt until 21 July 2024 to score his first goal of the season, doing so in a 2–1 win over Degerfors. Hopcutt then scored his second goal in the Superettan relegation play-off second leg against Lund, securing a 3–2 win, and a 5–2 win on aggregate.

==== 2025 season ====
With a 95th minute penalty, Hopcutt scored the only goal in the opening game victory over Trelleborg, on 30 March 2025. Just two games later, on 12 April 2025, Hopcutt saw his penalty saved by Umeå goalkeeper Pontus Eriksson, who had stepped away from his line before the penalty was taken, leading to a retaken penalty which Hopcutt scored, securing a stoppage time equaliser. Hopcutt had by then scored two goals in only 27 minutes of play in the 2025 Superettan, but was left out of the squad for four straight games in May due to injury. Hopcutt scored once in a 3–1 win over Falkenberg on 19 July 2025, before scoring twice in a 2–2 draw against Helsingborg two games later, on 2 August 2025.

The following year, Hopcutt joined UAE Second Division League side Forte Virtus, featuring in a matchday squad for the first time on 21 February 2026.

== Personal life ==
His father, Chris, is an ex-York Wasps rugby league winger. Growing up, Hopcutt supported Manchester United and was a season ticket holder. He also attended York High School.

Upon moving to Sweden, Hopcutt admitted the move was difficult, quoting: "It was difficult at first. I'd only ever lived at home with my mum and dad, and when I arrived at the airport it was a bit of a shock. The place was full of snow and I was alone in an apartment and I wasn't sure if I was doing the right thing." But since moving there, he has settled in the country with his Swedish girlfriend. In September 2018, having lived in Sweden for almost seven years, Hopcutt was granted Swedish Citizenship.

== Career statistics ==
As of match played 2 August 2025

Appearances and goals by club, season and competition
Club	Season	League			Cup		Other		Total	
Club	Season	Division	Apps	Goals	Apps	Goals	Apps	Goals	Apps	Goals
Östersunds FK	2012	Division 1	24	3	2	0	0	0	26	3
Östersunds FK	2013	Superettan	30	6	0	0	0	0	30	6
Östersunds FK	2014	Superettan	24	9	1	0	0	0	25	9
Östersunds FK	2015	Superettan	24	15	0	0	0	0	24	15
Östersunds FK	2016	Allsvenskan	1	0	1	0	0	0	2	0
Östersunds FK	2017	Allsvenskan	22	5	2	0	10 (Note: Appearance(s) in UEFA Europa League)	1	34	6
Östersunds FK	2018	Allsvenskan	23	5	5	1	0	0	30	6
Östersunds FK	2019	Allsvenskan	19	1	1	0	0	0	20	1
Östersunds FK	Total		167	44	12	1	10	1	189	46
GIF Sundsvall	2020	Superettan	14	3	1	0	0	0	15	3
Hapoel Kfar Saba	2020–21	Israeli Premier League	10	0	2	0	0	0	12	0
Oldham Athletic	2021–22	League Two	16	1	3	0	1 (Note: Appearance(s) in EFL Trophy)	0	19	1
IFK Mariehamn	2022	Veikkausliiga	8	2	—		—		8	2
IFK Mariehamn	2023	Veikkausliiga	24	4	2	0	2 (Note: Appearance(s) in Finnish League Cup)	0	28	4
IFK Mariehamn	Total		32	6	2	0	2	0	36	6
Östersunds FK	2024	Superettan	24	1	2	0	2 (Note: Appearance(s) in Superettan relegation play-offs)	1	28	2
Östersunds FK	2025	Superettan	11	5	1	0	0	0	12	5
Östersunds FK	Total		35	6	3	0	2	1	40	7
Östersunds FK total			202	50	15	1	12	2	229	53
Career total			263	59	21	1	15	2	299	62

== Honours ==
Östersund

- Division 1 Norra: 2012
- Superettan runner-up: 2015
- Svenska Cupen: 2016–17
