= Ronald Mukiibi =

Ugandan footballer (born 1991)

Personal information
- Full name: Ronald Brian Ddungu Mukiibi
- Date of birth: 16 September 1991 (age 35)
- Place of birth: Gothenburg, Sweden
- Height: 1.88 m (6 ft 2 in)
- Position: Centre-back

Team information
- Current team: Ljungskile SK (on loan from Utsiktens BK)
- Number: 5

Youth career
- Mossens BK
- Qviding FIF

Senior career*
Years	Team	Apps	(Gls)
2010–2013	Qviding FIF	40	(2)
2011	→ Gunnilse IS (loan)	9	(0)
2014–2015	BK Häcken	1	(0)
2015	→ Östersunds FK (loan)	22	(1)
2016–2021	Östersunds FK	97	(7)
2022	Degerfors	3	(0)
2023–	Utsiktens BK	16	(0)
2024–	→ Ljungskile SK (loan)	11	(1)

International career^{‡}
2019–	Uganda	5	(0)
- * Club domestic league appearances and goals as of 14 November 2024 ‡ National team caps and goals as of 4 January 2022

Ronald Mukiibi (born 16 September 1991) is a professional footballer who plays as a centre-back for Ljungskile SK, on loan from Utsiktens BK. Born in Sweden, he plays for the Uganda national team.

== Club career ==
His first Allsvenskan club was BK Häcken. He later spent several years in upstarts Östersunds FK. In the summer of 2021 he was released, only to return in September the same year after failing to find another club. After the 2021 season he was released again.

On 31 January 2022, Mukiibi signed a two-year contract with Degerfors.

== International career ==
Mukiibi was called up to the Uganda national football team for the 2017 Africa Cup of Nations, but declined the callup.

However, he accepted a call-up in 2019 when he was called up again for the 2019 Africa Cup of Nations preliminary squad, subsequently being named in the final 23-man squad on 11 June. He made his debut in a 1–0 win over Côte d'Ivoire on 15 June 2019.

== Career statistics ==
=== International ===
As of matches played on 15 August 2019

Uganda national team
Year	Apps	Goals
2019	2	0
Total	2	0
