= Aly Keita =

Footballer (born 1986)

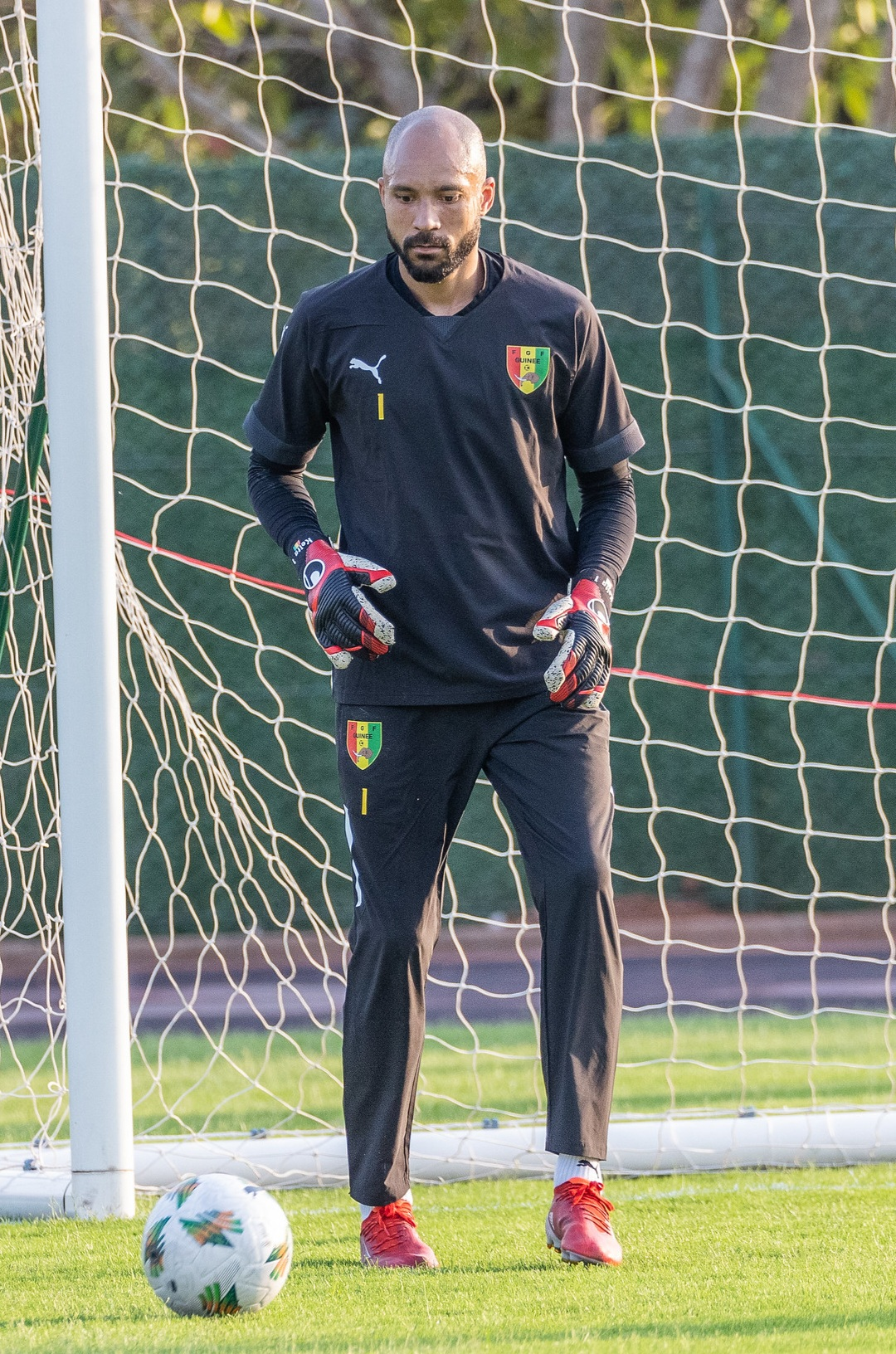

Personal information
- Full name: Aly Keita
- Date of birth: 8 December 1986 (age 39)
- Place of birth: Västerås, Sweden
- Height: 1.87 m (6 ft 2 in)
- Position: Goalkeeper

Youth career
- IK Oden

Senior career*
Years	Team	Apps	(Gls)
2007–2012	Syrianska IF	31	(0)
2012–2014	Västerås SK	30	(0)
2014–2024	Östersunds FK	213	(0)

International career^{‡}
2018–2022	Guinea	24	(0)
- * Club domestic league appearances and goals as of 15 July 2024 ‡ National team caps and goals as of 2 June 2023

Aly Keita (born 8 December 1986) is a former professional footballer who last played as a goalkeeper for Östersunds FK. Born in Sweden, he accumulated 24 caps for the Guinea national team.

== Club career ==
=== Early career (2007-2013) ===
Keita started his career at Skiljebo SK, before moving to Syrianska IF in 2007. Just before the 2012 season, Keita left Syrianska IF on a free transfer to Västerås SK. He then joined Östersunds FK ahead of the 2014 season.

=== Promotion and European football (2014-2018) ===
Keita played most of the games in his second season with ÖFK, where they finished second in the league, securing an automatic promotion to Allsvenskan.

On 15 August 2016, Keita was attacked by a pitch invader during a game against Jönköpings Södra IF. In the closing of what would have been a 1–1 draw ended with an invader running onto the field and grabbed Keita. He later reported that during the confrontation, he was struck in the temple. After the incident, the 17-year old invader was arrested and the match was abandoned.

On 13 April 2017, Keita played in the 4-1 Swedish Cup final victory against IFK Norrköping. This qualified ÖFK to the second qualifying round of the 2017-18 Europa League. Keita played all qualifier games against Galatasaray and Fola Esch. In the final seconds of the play-off reverse fixture against PAOK, Keita threw himself onto the post, saving a header by the far post to keep the aggregate score at 3-3 and qualify ÖFK to the Europa League on away goals. On 19 October 2017, in a group stage Europa League match against Athletic Bilbao, Keita took a heavy touch on a back pass and slipped upon trying to recover the ball, allowing Aritz Aduriz to score the first goal in a 2-2 match. After finishing second in their group, Östersunds FK were knocked out of the Europa League 4–2 on aggregate in the Round of 32 against Arsenal.

=== Steady downfall and relegation (2019-2024) ===
After avoiding the relegation play-offs by one place in 2020, ÖFK finished last in Allsvenskan 2021, 18 points below the relegation play-off spot.

At the end of the 2022 Superettan, Keita played in the relegation play-off reverse fixture against Falkenberg. ÖFK narrowly avoided a double relegation to the third tier by winning 3–1 on aggregate.

=== Drug-impaired driving incident and retirement (2024) ===
On June 20, 2024, Aly Keita was indefinitely suspended by Östersunds FK following being suspected of drug-impaired driving and money laundering. Three months later, he was found guilty of drug-impaired driving, and got fired by ÖFK. His money laundering investigation was later dropped.

== International career ==
Keita was born in Sweden to a Guinean father and a Norwegian mother. He opted to represent the Guinea national football team in April 2018, and he received a call-up to the national team in October 2018. Keita made his debut for Guinea in a 2–0 2019 Africa Cup of Nations qualification win over Rwanda on 12 October 2018.

== Career statistics ==
=== Club ===
As of match played 16 June 2024.

Club	Season	League			Cup		Continental		Total	
Club	Season	Division	Apps	Goals	Apps	Goals	Apps	Goals	Apps	Goals
Syrianska IF	2010	Division 1 Norra	8	0	0	0	–		8	0
Syrianska IF	2011	Division 1 Norra	23	0	0	0	–		23	0
Syrianska IF	Total		31	0	0	0	0	0	31	0
Västerås SK	2012	Division 1 Norra	21	0	0	0	–		21	0
Västerås SK	2013	Division 1 Norra	9	0	0	0	–		9	0
Västerås SK	Total		30	0	0	0	0	0	30	0
Östersunds FK	2014	Superettan	14	0	1 (Note: Appearance(s) in Svenska Cupen)	0	–		15	0
Östersunds FK	2015	Superettan	23	0	0	0	–		23	0
Östersunds FK	2016	Allsvenskan	12	0	1	0	0	0	13	0
Östersunds FK	2017	Allsvenskan	21	0	2	0	14 (Note: Appearance(s) in UEFA Europa League)	0	37	0
Östersunds FK	2018	Allsvenskan	22	0	3	0	0	0	25	0
Östersunds FK	2019	Allsvenskan	23	0	3	0	0	0	26	0
Östersunds FK	2020	Allsvenskan	29	0	3	0	0	0	32	0
Östersunds FK	2021	Allsvenskan	24	0	4	0	0	0	28	0
Östersunds FK	2022	Superettan	18	0	0	0	–		18	0
Östersunds FK	2023	Superettan	21	0	1	0	–		22	0
Östersunds FK	2024	Superettan	6	0	2	0	–		8	0
Östersunds FK	Total		213	0	20	0	14	0	247	0
Career total			274	0	20	0	14	0	308	0

=== International ===
Appearances and goals by national team and year

As of matches played on 24 January 2022'

National team	Year	Apps	Goals
Guinea	2018	3	0
Guinea	2019	6	0
Guinea	2020	3	0
Guinea	2021	6	0
Guinea	2022	6	0
Total		24	0

== Honours ==
Östersunds FK

- Svenska Cupen: 2016–17
