= Hosam Aiesh =

Swedish footballer (born 1995)

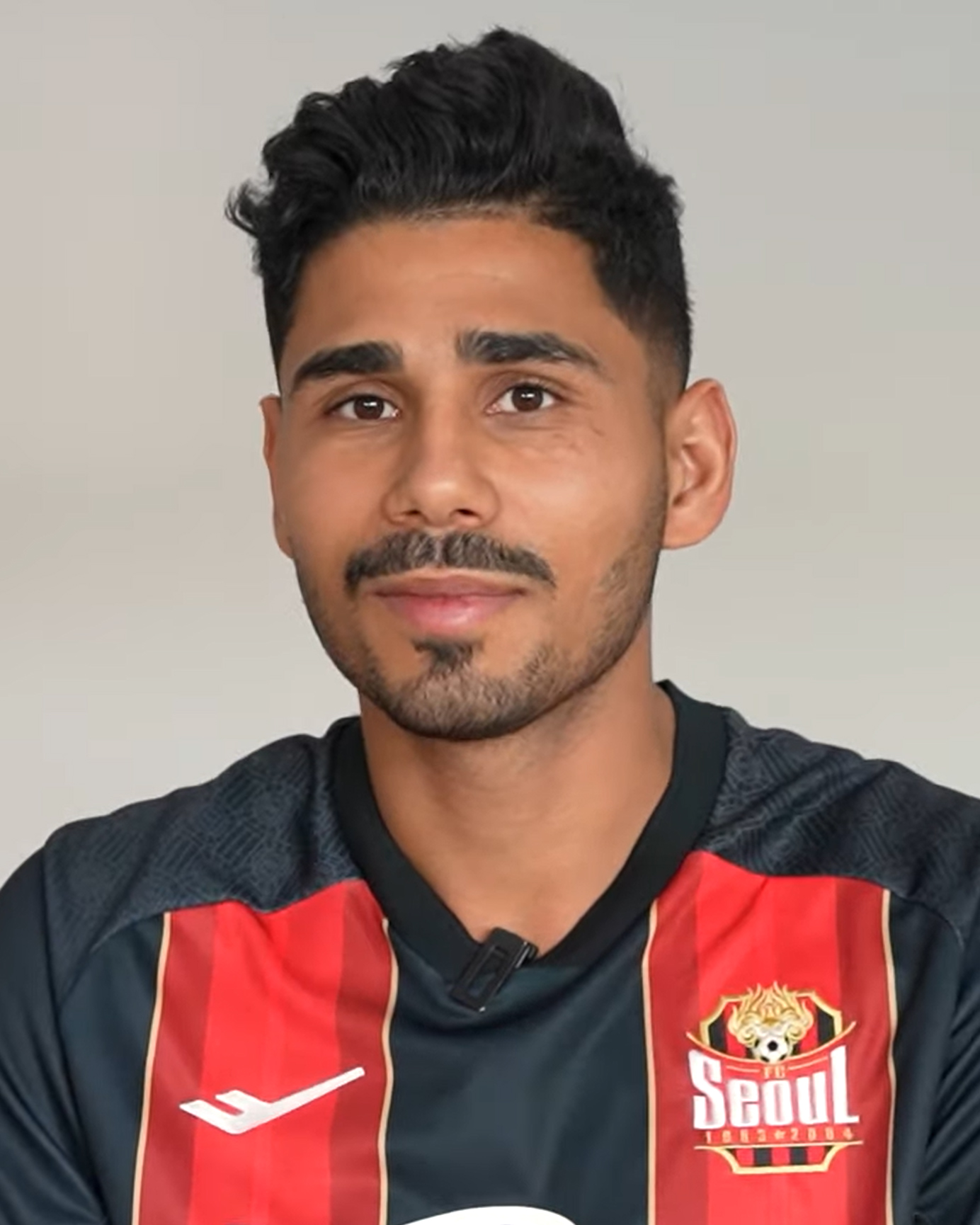
- Aiesh with Seoul in 2023

Personal information
- Full name: Hosam Aiesh
- Date of birth: 14 April 1995 (age 31)
- Place of birth: Gothenburg, Sweden
- Height: 1.80 m (5 ft 11 in)
- Position: Right winger

Youth career
- –2009: Azalea BK
- 2009–2013: BK Häcken

Senior career*
Years	Team	Apps	(Gls)
2013–2014	BK Häcken	1	(0)
2014	→ Varbergs BoIS (loan)	11	(1)
2015–2019	Östersunds FK	93	(10)
2016	→ Varbergs BoIS (loan)	12	(2)
2019–2022	IFK Göteborg	80	(8)
2023–2024	FC Seoul	3	(0)
2024	Utsiktens BK	0	(0)
Total		200	(21)

International career
2014–2015	Sweden U19	3	(0)
2019	Sweden	1	(0)
2022–2023	Syria	3	(0)
- * Club domestic league appearances and goals

Hosam Aiesh (Arabic: حُسَام عَايِش, Husâm Âyiş, born 14 April 1995) is a former professional footballer who played as a right winger. Born in Sweden, Aiesh represented them at both youth and senior level before switching his allegiance to Syria in 2022. He spend the majority of his career at Östersunds FK and IFK Göteborg in Allsvenskan.

== Club career ==
Hosam Aiesh began his career in academy of Swedish side BK Häcken. After spending a season on loan at the Varbergs BolS in 2014, he joined Östersunds FK on 1 January 2015 on a free transfer. However on 1 April 2016 he re-joined Varbergs BolS on loan until 1 July 2016.

In 2017, Aiesh managed to win his first major trophy, the 2017 Svenska Cupen, after Östersund defeated IFK Norrköping 4–1 in the final, as a result of the victory, also qualifying for the 2017–18 UEFA Europa League, marking their first appearance in a European competition tournament. In their Europa League debut in the second qualifying round on 13 July 2017. Östersund earned a shock 2–0 victory against Turkish giants Galatasaray at the Jämtkraft Arena and eliminated them after a 1–1 draw in Istanbul.

Aiesh's teammate Saman Ghoddos scored 2 goals in a win against PAOK on 24 August saw them qualify for the Group Stage at the first time of asking, After losing only one game in their campaign, they finished second in a group featuring Athletic Bilbao and Hertha Berlin, becoming the first Swedish club to progress beyond the Europa League group stage since UEFA rebranded the UEFA Cup into Europa League.

Östersund were knocked out by English side Arsenal, after Östersund lost the 1st leg 2–0, they beat Arsenal in the 2nd leg at the Emirates Stadium with a 2–1 victory after a goal from Aiesh and his teammate Ken Sema.

Hosam Aiesh joined IFK Göteborg in 2019.

Hosam Aiesh joined FC Seoul in 2023.

== International career ==
=== Sweden ===
Born in Sweden to Palestinian Syrian parents, Aiesh is eligible to represent Palestine, Syria and Sweden. In August 2017, he declared his intent to represent Palestine. However, he was called up for Sweden on 3 December 2018 and earned his only cap on 9 January 2019 when he started for Sweden in a friendly against Finland. Due to the fact that his only cap for Sweden came in a friendly, he remained eligible for Syria and Palestine.

=== Syria ===
On 1 February 2022, Aiesh debuted for Syria in a 2–0 loss to South Korea in qualification towards the 2022 FIFA World Cup entering the match as a substitute in the 60th minute for Amro Jenyat.

== Career statistics ==
=== Club ===
As of 30 October 2022

Appearances and goals by club, season and competition
Club	Season	League			Cup		Continental		Other		Total	
Club	Season	Division	Apps	Goals	Apps	Goals	Apps	Goals	Apps	Goals	Apps	Goals
BK Häcken	2013	Allsvenskan	0	0	1 (Note: Appearances in the Svenska Cupen)	0	–		0	0	1	0
BK Häcken	2014	Allsvenskan	1	0	0	0	–		0	0	1	0
BK Häcken	Total		1	0	1	0	0	0	0	0	2	0
Varbergs BoIS (loan)	2014	Superettan	11	1	1	0	–		0	0	12	1
Östersunds FK	2015	Superettan	24	2	0	0	–		0	0	24	2
Östersunds FK	2016	Allsvenskan	15	1	3	0	–		0	0	18	1
Östersunds FK	2017	Allsvenskan	17	1	6	4	5 (Note: Appearances in the UEFA Europa League)	0	0	0	28	5
Östersunds FK	2018	Allsvenskan	23	3	4	0	1	1	0	0	28	4
Östersunds FK	2019	Allsvenskan	14	3	0	0	0	0	0	0	14	3
Östersunds FK	Total		93	10	14	4	6	1	0	0	113	15
Varbergs BoIS (loan)	2016	Superettan	12	2	0	0	–		0	0	12	2
IFK Göteborg	2019	Allsvenskan	9	1	0	0	–		0	0	9	1
IFK Göteborg	2020	Allsvenskan	22	3	7	0	–		2	0	29	5
IFK Göteborg	2021	Allsvenskan	23	2	3	0	–		1	0	27	2
IFK Göteborg	2022	Allsvenskan	26	2	5	1	–		0	0	18	1
IFK Göteborg	Total		80	8	15	1	0	0	0	0	96	9
Career total			198	20	30	5	6	1	0	0	234	26

== Honours ==
Östersunds FK

- Svenska Cupen: 2017

IFK Göteborg

- Svenska Cupen: 2020

Individual

- Allsvenskan top assist provider: 2018
