= Alhaji Gero =

Nigerian footballer (born 1993)

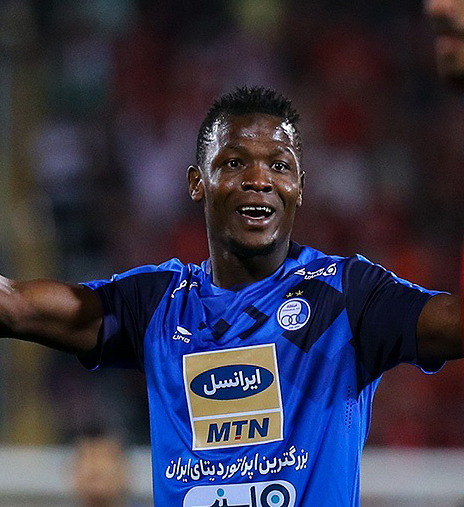
- Gero playing for Esteghlal in 2018

Personal information
- Full name: Salisu Abdullahi Gero
- Date of birth: 10 October 1993 (age 33)
- Place of birth: Kano State, Nigeria
- Height: 1.89 m (6 ft 2 in)
- Position: Forward

Team information
- Current team: Jhapa
- Number: 9

Youth career
- 2009–2010: El-Kanemi Warriors

Senior career*
| Years | Team | Apps | (Gls) |
| 2010–2011 | Lobi Stars | | |
| 2012 | Kaduna United | 14 | (0) |
| 2012–2013 | Enugu Rangers | | |
| 2013–2014 | Östers IF | 36 | (9) |
| 2015–2016 | Viborg FF | 23 | (1) |
| 2016–2018 | Östersunds FK | 55 | (6) |
| 2018 | Esteghlal | 8 | (1) |
| 2019 | Östersunds FK | 13 | (1) |
| 2019–2021 | Helsingborgs IF | 33 | (4) |
| 2022 | FF Jaro | 10 | (6) |
| 2023 | TPS | 25 | (9) |
| 2024–2025 | Barito Putera | 15 | (1) |
| 2025 | Hong Linh Hà Tĩnh | 3 | (0) |
| 2025– | Jhapa | 6 | (1) |

International career
| 2012–2013 | Nigeria U20 | 16 | (6) |
- * Club domestic league appearances and goals as of 16 April 2025

Salisu Abdullahi "Alhaji" Gero (born 10 October 1993) is a Nigerian professional footballer who plays as a forward for Nepal Super League club Jhapa.

== Club career ==
=== Early years ===
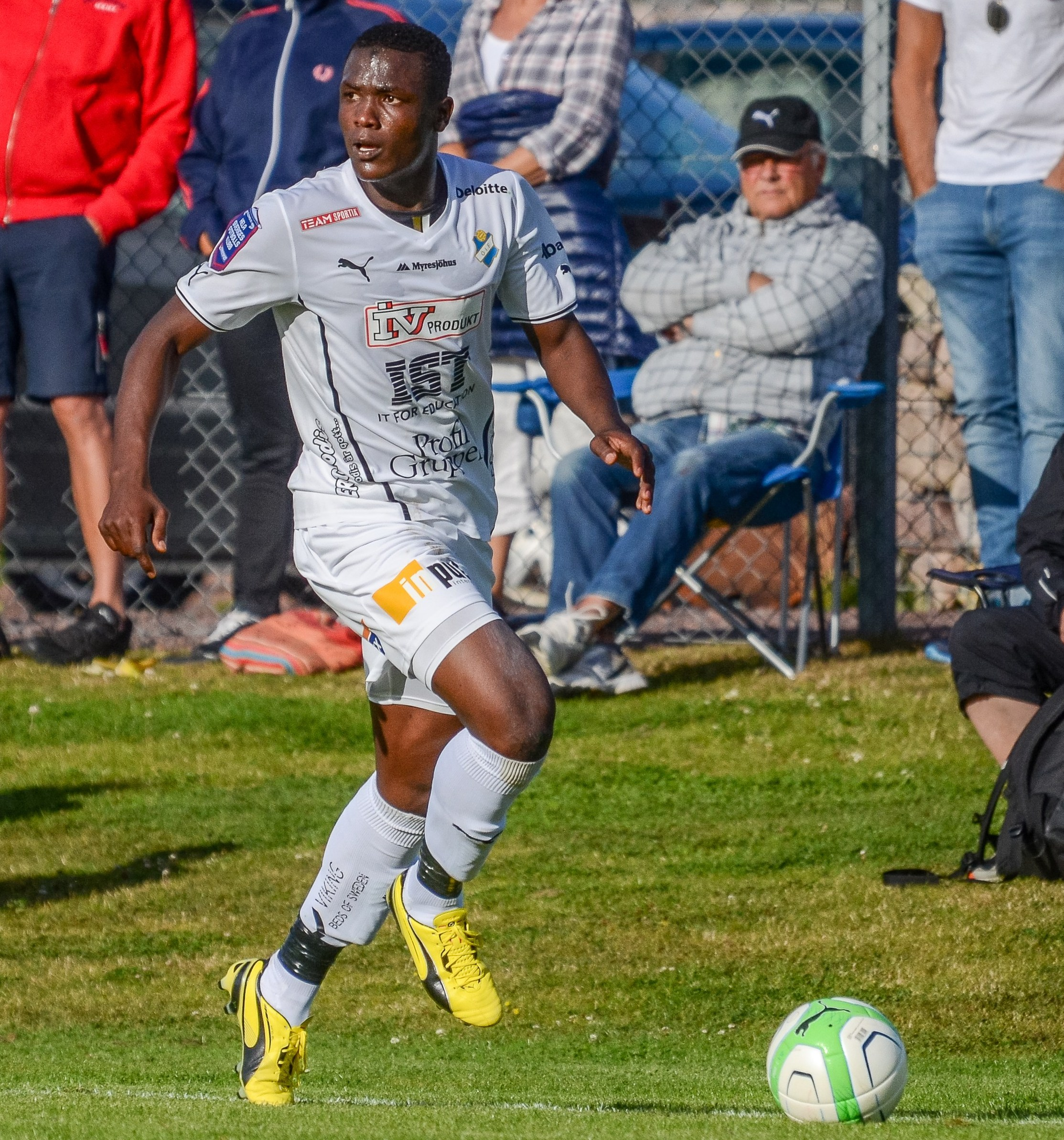
Gero playing his first U21 game for Östers IF against Kalmar FF

Gero started out playing football in the streets of Kano before signing his first professional contract with El-Kanemi Warriors at age sixteen. The next year he moved on to Lobi Stars. During the midseason transfer window in April 2012, Gero moved to Enugu Rangers from Kaduna United and scored instantly on his debut in against Akwa United which helped his team to a valuable 1–1 draw that kept them in touching distance of winning the 2012 Nigeria Premier League.

In August 2013, Gero signed a contract with Östers IF, a team relegated to the Superettan for the 2014 season (the 2nd highest league in Sweden).

In December 2014, Danish club Viborg FF announced that they signed Alhaji on a free transfer. He played 15 matches and scored 1 goal in his first season.

On 16 January 2016, Viborg FF and Gero agreed to terminate the contract after minimal playing time.

=== Östersunds ===
Gero signed with Östersunds FK on 18 January 2016. On 14 September 2017, he scored his first goal in a European competition against Zorya Luhansk.

=== Esteghlal ===
On 8 August 2018, Gero signed for Iranian team Esteghlal on a three-year contract. He was given the number 9 shirt, the same jersey number he used to wear at Östersunds FK.

Gero made his debut his debut on 10 August 2018 as a second-half substitute for Voria Ghafouri in a 3–0 League victory against Tractor Sazi. He scored his first goal for the club in Hazfi Cup round of 16 against Saipa, a penalty in a match that finished 2–2 after 120 minutes but lost the match 1–3 in penalty shoot-out eventually. On 16 December, his contract with Esteghlal was terminated by mutual agreement, having spent only four months with the club and failing to score any goals in the league.

=== Return to Sweden ===
On 25 February 2019, Östersunds re-signed Gero. On 9 July 2019, however, he signed a two-year contract with recently promoted club Helsingborgs IF.

=== Move to Finland ===
On 13 August 2022, Gero joined Finnish club Jaro, signing a contract until the end of the season. On 8 March 2023, Gero signed a one-year contract with TPS in Finland.

== International career ==
Gero made his debut for the Nigeria national under-20 team at the 8 nation tournament in South Africa. He scored two goals on his competitive debut for the U20 team in their 2–1 away win against Tanzania at the 2013 African U-20 Championship qualification. He scored again on the return leg of the same fixture which Nigeria has now won 4–1 on aggregate. Gero also played for the U20 team in the 2013 FIFA U-20 World Cup.

At the same year 2013, he was called up for the Nigeria national team that played against the Ivory Coast national team for the 2014 African Nations Championship qualification.

== Personal life ==
Gero's younger brother Ahmad is also a professional football player.

== Career statistics ==
=== Club ===
As of 16 April 2025

Appearances and goals by club, season and competition
| Club | Season | League | | | National Cup | | Continental^{1} | | Other^{2} | | Total | |
| Club | Season | Division | Apps | Goals | Apps | Goals | Apps | Goals | Apps | Goals | Apps | Goals |
|---|---|---|---|---|---|---|---|---|---|---|---|---|
| Öster | 2013 | Allsvenskan | 10 | 1 | 1 | 0 | — | | — | | 11 | 1 |
| Öster | 2014 | Superettan | 26 | 8 | 4 | 0 | — | | 2 | 0 | 32 | 8 |
| Öster | Total | | 36 | 9 | 5 | 0 | 0 | 0 | 2 | 0 | 43 | 9 |
| Viborg | 2014–15 | Danish 1st Division | 15 | 1 | 0 | 0 | — | | — | | 15 | 1 |
| Viborg | 2015–16 | Danish Superliga | 8 | 0 | 2 | 2 | — | | — | | 10 | 2 |
| Viborg | Total | | 23 | 1 | 2 | 2 | 0 | 0 | 0 | 0 | 25 | 3 |
| Östersund | 2016 | Allsvenskan | 22 | 3 | 4 | 2 | — | | — | | 26 | 5 |
| Östersund | 2017 | Allsvenskan | 24 | 2 | 5 | 1 | 11 | 2 | — | | 40 | 5 |
| Östersund | 2018 | Allsvenskan | 9 | 1 | 2 | 1 | 1 | 0 | — | | 12 | 2 |
| Östersund | Total | | 55 | 6 | 11 | 4 | 12 | 2 | 0 | 0 | 78 | 12 |
| Esteghlal | 2018–19 | Persian Gulf Pro League | 7 | 0 | 2 | 1 | 1 | 0 | — | | 10 | 1 |
| Östersund | 2019 | Allsvenskan | 13 | 1 | 0 | 0 | — | | — | | 13 | 1 |
| Helsingborg | 2019 | Allsvenskan | 13 | 3 | 1 | 0 | — | | — | | 14 | 3 |
| Helsingborg | 2020 | Allsvenskan | 17 | 1 | 3 | 2 | — | | — | | 20 | 3 |
| Helsingborg | 2021 | Superettan | 3 | 0 | 0 | 0 | — | | — | | 3 | 0 |
| Helsingborg | Total | | 33 | 4 | 4 | 2 | 0 | 0 | 0 | 0 | 37 | 6 |
| Jaro | 2022 | Ykkönen | 10 | 6 | 0 | 0 | — | | — | | 10 | 6 |
| TPS | 2023 | Ykkönen | 25 | 9 | 0 | 0 | — | | — | | 25 | 9 |
| Barito Putera | 2024–25 | Liga 1 Indonesia | 15 | 1 | 0 | 0 | — | | — | | 15 | 1 |
| Ha Tinh | 2024–25 | V.League 1 | 3 | 0 | 0 | 0 | – | | – | | 3 | 0 |
| Jhapa | 2025 | Nepal Super League | 6 | 1 | 0 | 0 | – | | – | | 6 | 1 |
| Career total | | | 225 | 38 | 24 | 9 | 13 | 2 | 2 | 0 | 264 | 49 |

Notes

^{1} Includes Europa League and AFC Champions League matches.
^{2} Includes appearance(s) in Superettan Relegation play-offs.

== Honours ==
Viborg

- Danish 1st Division: 2014–15

Östersunds

- Svenska Cupen: 2016–17
