= 2015 in Swedish football =

Football in Sweden
- Season: 2015

Men's football
- Allsvenskan: IFK Norrköping
- Svenska Cupen: IFK Göteborg

The 2015 season is the 118th season of competitive football in Sweden. The competitive started with the group stage of Svenska Cupen on 21 February. League competition started in early April with Allsvenskan on 5 April, Superettan on 5 April and Division 1 on 12 April. Svenska Cupen concluded with the final on 17 May. Allsvenskan will conclude on 31 October, Superettan and Division 1 on 1 November and lower men's leagues on the weekend before. Qualification play-offs were held after the end of league play with the Allsvenskan and Superettan play-offs being held on 4/5 and 7/8 November. Svenska Supercupen was held on 8 November and will be contested by the winner of Allsvenskan and Svenska Cupen. Sweden participated in qualifying for the UEFA Euro 2016.

== Honours ==
=== Men's football ===
==== Official titles ====
Title	Team	Reason
Swedish Champions 2015	IFK Norrköping	Winners of Allsvenskan
Swedish Cup Champions 2014–15	IFK Göteborg	Winners of Svenska Cupen
Swedish Super Cup Champions 2015	IFK Norrköping	Winners of Svenska Supercupen

==== Competitions ====
Level	Competition	Team
1st level	2015 Allsvenskan	IFK Norrköping
2nd level	2015 Superettan	Jönköpings Södra IF
3rd level	2015 Swedish football Division 1 Norra	Dalkurd FF
3rd level	2015 Swedish football Division 1 Södra	Trelleborgs FF
National cup	2014–15 Svenska Cupen	IFK Göteborg
Super cup	2015 Svenska Supercupen	IFK Norrköping

=== Women's football ===
==== Official titles ====
Title	Team	Reason
Swedish Champions 2015	FC Rosengård	Winners of Damallsvenskan
Swedish Cup Champions 2014–15	Linköpings FC	Winners of Svenska Cupen

==== Competitions ====
Level	Competition	Team
1st level	2015 Damallsvenskan	FC Rosengård
2nd level	2015 Elitettan	Kvarnsvedens IK
National cup	2014–15 Svenska Cupen	Linköpings FC

== Promotions, relegations and qualifications ==
=== Men's football ===
==== International qualifications ====
Tournament	Enter round	Team	Qualification method
2016–17 UEFA Champions League	Second qualifying round	IFK Norrköping	Winners of 2015 Allsvenskan
2016–17 UEFA Europa League	Second qualifying round	BK Häcken	Winners of 2015–16 Svenska Cupen
2016–17 UEFA Europa League	First qualifying round	IFK Göteborg	Runners-up of 2015 Allsvenskan
2016–17 UEFA Europa League	First qualifying round	AIK	Third-placed team of 2015 Allsvenskan

== Domestic results ==
=== Men's football ===
==== 2015 Allsvenskan ====
Pos	Team	Pld	W	D	L	GF	GA	GD	Pts	Qualification or relegation
1	IFK Norrköping (C)	30	20	6	4	60	33	+27	66	Qualification for the Champions League second qualifying round
2	IFK Göteborg	30	18	9	3	52	22	+30	63	Qualification for the Europa League first qualifying round
3	AIK	30	18	7	5	54	34	+20	61	Qualification for the Europa League first qualifying round
4	IF Elfsborg	30	16	7	7	59	42	+17	55	
5	Malmö FF	30	15	9	6	54	34	+20	54	
6	Djurgårdens IF	30	14	9	7	52	37	+15	51	
7	BK Häcken	30	13	6	11	45	39	+6	45	Qualification for the Europa League second qualifying round (Note: BK Häcken qualified for the Europa League second qualifying round by winning the 2015–16 Svenska Cupen.)
8	Helsingborgs IF	30	11	4	15	43	45	−2	37	
9	Örebro SK	30	9	10	11	36	50	−14	37	
10	Gefle IF	30	10	6	14	35	50	−15	36	
11	Hammarby IF	30	8	9	13	35	39	−4	33	
12	GIF Sundsvall	30	9	5	16	34	52	−18	32	
13	Kalmar FF	30	8	7	15	31	42	−11	31	
14	Falkenbergs FF (O)	30	7	4	19	38	56	−18	25	Qualification for the relegation play-offs
15	Halmstads BK (R)	30	4	9	17	21	44	−23	21	Relegation to the Superettan
16	Åtvidabergs FF (R)	30	2	9	19	25	55	−30	15	Relegation to the Superettan

Source: svenskfotboll.se (in Swedish)
Rules for classification: 1) Points; 2) Goal difference; 3) Goals scored; 4) Head-to-head points; 5) Head-to-head goal difference; 6) Head-to-head away goals scored; 7) Play-off
(Note: Play-off is only played if need to decide champion, teams for relegation or UEFA competition and will be played on a neutral ground).
(C) Champions; (O) Play-off winners; (R) Relegated

==== 2016 Allsvenskan playoffs ====
5 November 2015
18:00 (UTC+2)

IK Sirius	2–2	Falkenbergs FF
Ogbu 11', 64'	Report	Nilsson 19', 56'

Studenternas IP, Uppsala
Attendance: 7,100
Referee: Andreas Ekberg
8 November 2015
18:00 (UTC+2)

Falkenbergs FF	1–1	IK Sirius
Keat 56'	Report	Eriksson 19'

Falkenbergs IP, Falkenberg
Attendance: 3,594
Referee: Mohammed Al-Hakim

==== 2015 Superettan ====
Pos	Team	Pld	W	D	L	GF	GA	GD	Pts	Promotion, qualification or relegation
1	Jönköpings Södra IF (C, P)	30	19	6	5	54	28	+26	63	Promotion to Allsvenskan
2	Östersunds FK (P)	30	18	8	4	56	25	+31	62	Promotion to Allsvenskan
3	IK Sirius	30	15	13	2	53	25	+28	58	Qualification to Promotion playoffs
4	Assyriska FF	30	14	5	11	46	37	+9	47	
5	Varbergs BoIS	30	12	11	7	34	27	+7	47	
6	Ljungskile SK	30	11	10	9	44	37	+7	43	
7	Syrianska FC	30	11	10	9	37	30	+7	43	
8	AFC United	30	10	10	10	43	44	−1	40	
9	Degerfors IF	30	10	8	12	36	38	−2	38	
10	IFK Värnamo	30	10	8	12	37	40	−3	38	
11	GAIS	30	10	5	15	37	44	−7	35	
12	Ängelholms FF	30	8	9	13	31	47	−16	33	
13	Mjällby AIF (R)	30	8	6	16	23	43	−20	30	Qualification to Relegation playoffs
14	IK Frej (O)	30	7	8	15	22	44	−22	29	Qualification to Relegation playoffs
15	Utsiktens BK (R)	30	7	5	18	28	56	−28	26	Relegation to Division 1
16	IF Brommapojkarna (R)	30	5	8	17	30	46	−16	23	Relegation to Division 1

Source: svenskfotboll.se (in Swedish)
Rules for classification: 1) Points; 2) Goal difference; 3) Number of goals scored; 4) Head-to-head points; 5) Head-to-head goal difference; 6) Head-to-head away goals scored
(C) Champions; (O) Play-off winners; (P) Promoted; (R) Relegated

==== 2016 Superettan play-offs ====
5 November 2015
18:30 (UTC+2)

Akropolis IF	0–1	IK Frej
	Report	Lallet 7'

Spånga IP, Stockholm
Attendance: 3,084
Referee: Lars Olsson
5 November 2015
18:30 (UTC+2)

Örgryte IS	1–0	Mjällby AIF
Paulson 60'	Report

Gamla Ullevi, Gothenburg
Attendance: 5,809
Referee: Nermin Cisic

8 November 2015
15:00 (UTC+2)

IK Frej	1–0	Akropolis IF
Lallet 72'	Report

Vikingavallen, Täby
Attendance: 2,012
Referee: Per Melin
8 November 2015
15:00 (UTC+2)

Mjällby AIF	1–1 (a.e.t.)	Örgryte IS
Terzić 83'	Report	Sahlin 104'

Strandvallen, Hällevik
Attendance: 3,522
Referee: Kaspar Sjöberg

==== 2015 Division 1 Norra ====
Pos	Team	Pld	W	D	L	GF	GA	GD	Pts	Promotion, qualification or relegation
1	Dalkurd FF (C, P)	26	18	7	1	52	16	+36	61	Promotion to Superettan
2	Akropolis IF (Q)	26	13	9	4	41	21	+20	48	Qualification to Promotion playoffs
3	IFK Luleå	26	12	9	5	41	29	+12	45	
4	BK Forward	26	11	9	6	47	34	+13	42	
5	Umeå FC	26	12	4	10	48	40	+8	40	
6	Nyköpings BIS	26	9	10	7	42	32	+10	37	
7	IK Brage	26	9	5	12	38	38	0	32	
8	Carlstad United BK	26	8	8	10	32	42	−10	32	
9	Piteå IF	26	8	6	12	43	44	−1	30	
10	Västerås SK	26	8	5	13	36	51	−15	29	
11	Vasalunds IF	26	8	5	13	30	46	−16	29	
12	Huddinge IF (R)	26	9	2	15	36	53	−17	29	Relegation to Division 2
13	Södertälje FK (R)	26	6	8	12	35	47	−12	26	Relegation to Division 2
14	Motala AIF (R)	26	6	3	17	31	59	−28	21	Relegation to Division 2

Source: svenskfotboll.se (in Swedish)
Rules for classification: 1) Points; 2) Goal difference; 3) Number of goals scored; 4) Head-to-head points; 5) Head-to-head goal difference; 6) Head-to-head away goals scored
(C) Champions; (P) Promoted; (Q) Qualified for the phase indicated; (R) Relegated

==== 2015 Division 1 Södra ====
Pos	Team	Pld	W	D	L	GF	GA	GD	Pts	Promotion, qualification or relegation
1	Trelleborgs FF (C, P)	26	20	4	2	65	25	+40	64	Promotion to Superettan
2	Örgryte IS (O, P)	26	18	3	5	70	26	+44	57	Qualification to Promotion playoffs
3	Östers IF	26	15	5	6	39	19	+20	50	
4	IK Oddevold	26	11	7	8	46	35	+11	40	
5	Kristianstads FF	26	11	5	10	38	51	−13	38	
6	Landskrona BoIS	26	11	4	11	37	32	+5	37	
7	FC Höllviken	26	9	8	9	38	33	+5	35	
8	Oskarshamns AIK	26	10	5	11	41	42	−1	35	
9	Qviding FIF	26	7	8	11	30	41	−11	29	
10	Norrby IF	26	8	5	13	45	57	−12	29	
11	Husqvarna FF	26	8	5	13	36	51	−15	29	
12	IS Halmia (R)	26	7	4	15	41	54	−13	25	Relegation to Division 2
13	Eskilsminne IF (R)	26	5	10	11	35	51	−16	25	Relegation to Division 2
14	Lunds BK (R)	26	4	3	19	21	65	−44	15	Relegation to Division 2

Source: svenskfotboll.se (in Swedish)
Rules for classification: 1) Points; 2) Goal difference; 3) Number of goals scored; 4) Head-to-head points; 5) Head-to-head goal difference; 6) Head-to-head away goals scored
(C) Champions; (O) Play-off winners; (P) Promoted; (R) Relegated

==== 2015 Svenska Supercupen ====
8 November 2015
19:30 (UTC+2)

IFK Norrköping	3–0	IFK Göteborg
Fransson 3'; Nyman 15'; Kujović 43'	Report

Nya Parken, Norrköping
Attendance: 2,662
Referee: Johan Hamlin

=== Women's football ===
==== 2015 Damallsvenskan ====
Pos	Team	Pld	W	D	L	GF	GA	GD	Pts	Qualification or relegation
1	FC Rosengård (C, Q)	22	15	6	1	60	16	+44	51	Qualification to Champions League Round of 32
2	Eskilstuna United DFF (Q)	22	16	2	4	41	15	+26	50	Qualification to Champions League Round of 32
3	Piteå IF	22	13	6	3	45	25	+20	45	
4	Linköpings FC	22	14	2	6	43	17	+26	44	
5	KIF Örebro	22	10	4	8	36	30	+6	34	
6	Kopparbergs/Göteborg FC	22	9	5	8	32	33	−1	32	
7	Kristianstads DFF	22	8	3	11	33	41	−8	27	
8	Umeå IK	22	6	6	10	28	34	−6	24	
9	Vittsjö GIK	22	6	6	10	26	38	−12	24	
10	Mallbackens IF	22	5	3	14	19	36	−17	18	
11	Hammarby IF (R)	22	3	9	10	20	38	−18	18	Relegation to Elitettan
12	AIK (R)	22	0	2	20	11	71	−60	2	Relegation to Elitettan

Updated to match(es) played on 18 October 2015. Source: svenskfotboll.se (in Swedish)
Rules for classification: 1) Points; 2) Goal difference; 3) Number of goals scored; 4) Head-to-head points; 5) Head-to-head goal difference; 6) Head-to-head away goals scored
(C) Champions; (Q) Qualified for the phase indicated; (R) Relegated

==== 2015 Elitettan ====
Pos	Team	Pld	W	D	L	GF	GA	GD	Pts	Promotion, qualification or relegation
1	Kvarnsvedens IK	26	21	3	2	76	15	+61	66	Promotion to Damallsvenskan
2	Djurgårdens IF	26	19	4	3	80	32	+48	61	Promotion to Damallsvenskan
3	IFK Kalmar	26	17	5	4	62	37	+25	56	
4	IF Limhamn Bunkeflo	26	15	5	6	61	35	+26	50	
5	Hovås Billdal IF	26	15	5	6	40	30	+10	50	
6	IK Sirius	26	12	8	6	39	27	+12	44	
7	Sunnanå SK	26	9	5	12	52	48	+4	32	
8	Östersunds DFF	26	7	7	12	41	54	−13	28	
9	QBIK	26	5	9	12	29	38	−9	24	
10	Kungsbacka DFF	26	6	6	14	34	55	−21	24	
11	Älta IF	26	6	5	15	37	71	−34	23	
12	Jitex BK	26	5	5	16	28	52	−24	20	Relegation to Division 1
13	Bollstanäs SK	26	5	3	18	29	69	−40	18	Relegation to Division 1
14	Lidköpings FK	26	3	4	19	33	78	−45	13	Relegation to Division 1

Source: svenskfotboll.se (in Swedish)
Rules for classification: 1) Points; 2) Goal difference; 3) Number of goals scored; 4) Head-to-head points; 5) Head-to-head goal difference; 6) Head-to-head away goals scored

== National teams ==
=== Sweden men's national football team ===
==== UEFA Euro 2016 qualifying ====
Pos	Team	Pld	W	D	L	GF	GA	GD	Pts	Qualification	(Austria)	(Russia)	(Sweden)	(Montenegro)	(Liechtenstein)	(Moldova)
1	Austria	10	9	1	0	22	5	+17	28	Qualify for final tournament	—	1–0	1–1	1–0	3–0	1–0
2	Russia	10	6	2	2	21	5	+16	20	Qualify for final tournament	0–1	—	1–0	2–0	4–0	1–1
3	Sweden	10	5	3	2	15	9	+6	18	Advance to play-offs	1–4	1–1	—	3–1	2–0	2–0
4	Montenegro	10	3	2	5	10	13	−3	11		2–3	0–3 (Note: The Montenegro v Russia match was awarded as a 3–0 win to Russia after being abandoned at 0–0 due to crowd violence and a scuffle between players.)	1–1	—	2–0	2–0
5	Liechtenstein	10	1	2	7	2	26	−24	5		0–5	0–7	0–2	0–0	—	1–1
6	Moldova	10	0	2	8	4	16	−12	2		1–2	1–2	0–2	0–2	0–1	—

Source: UEFA
Rules for classification: Qualification tiebreakers
Notes:

Win Draw Loss

27 March 2015 Euro 2016 Q № 985	Moldova	0–2	Sweden	Chișinău, Moldova
20:45 UTC+2		Report	Ibrahimović 46', 84' (pen.)	Stadium: Stadionul Zimbru; Attendance: 10,375; Referee: Ivan Bebek (Croatia)

14 June 2015 Euro 2016 Q № 988	Sweden	3–1	Montenegro	Solna, Sweden
20:45 UTC+2	Berg 38'; Ibrahimović 40', 44'	Report	Damjanović 64'	Stadium: Friends Arena; Attendance: 32,224; Referee: Hüseyin Göçek (Turkey)

5 September 2015 Euro 2016 Q № 989	Russia	1–0	Sweden	Moscow, Russia
18:00 UTC+3	Dzyuba 38'	Report		Stadium: Otkrytiye Arena; Attendance: 43,768; Referee: Mark Clattenburg (England)

8 September 2015 Euro 2016 Q № 990	Sweden	1–4	Austria	Solna, Sweden
20:45 UTC+2	Ibrahimović 90+1'	Report	Alaba 9' (pen.); Harnik 38', 88'; Janko 77'	Stadium: Friends Arena; Attendance: 48,355; Referee: Carlos Velasco Carballo (Spain)

9 October 2015 Euro 2016 Q № 991	Liechtenstein	0–2	Sweden	Vaduz, Liechtenstein
20:45 UTC+2		Report	Berg 18'; Ibrahimović 55'	Stadium: Rheinpark Stadion; Attendance: 4,740; Referee: Liran Liany (Israel)

12 October 2015 Euro 2016 Q № 992	Sweden	2–0	Moldova	Solna, Sweden
18:00 UTC+2	Ibrahimović 24'; Zengin 48'	Report		Stadium: Friends Arena; Attendance: 25,351; Referee: Luca Banti (Italy)

==== UEFA Euro 2016 qualifying play-offs ====
14 November 2015 Euro 2016 play-offs № 993	Sweden	2–1	Denmark	Solna, Sweden
20:45 UTC+2	Forsberg 45'; Ibrahimović 50' (pen.)	Report	Jørgensen 80'	Stadium: Friends Arena; Attendance: 49,053; Referee: Nicola Rizzoli (Italy)

17 November 2015 Euro 2016 play-offs № 994	Denmark	2–2 (3–4 agg.)	Sweden	Copenhagen, Denmark
20 UTC+2	Y. Poulsen 82'; Vestergaard 90+1'	Report	Ibrahimović 19', 76'	Stadium: Telia Parken; Attendance: 36,051; Referee: Martin Atkinson (England)

==== Friendlies ====
Win Draw Loss

15 January 2015 Friendly № 983	Sweden	2–0	Ivory Coast	Abu Dhabi, United Arab Emirates
21:30 UTC+4	Mårtensson 65'; Rohdén 86'	Report		Stadium: Mohammed Bin Zayed Stadium; Attendance: 300; Referee: Yacoub Al Hammadi (United Arab Emirates)

19 January 2015 Friendly № 984	Sweden	0–1	Finland	Abu Dhabi, United Arab Emirates
22:30 UTC+4		Report	Riski 63'	Stadium: Mohammed Bin Zayed Stadium; Attendance: 100; Referee: Omar Al Ali (United Arab Emirates)

31 March 2015 Friendly № 986	Sweden	3–1	Iran	Solna, Sweden
19:30 UTC+2	Ibrahimović 11'; Berg 21'; Toivonen 89'	Report	Nekounam 24' (pen.)	Stadium: Friends Arena; Attendance: 33,773; Referee: Serdar Gözübüyük (Netherlands)

8 June 2015 Friendly № 987	Norway	0–0	Sweden	Oslo, Norway
20:00 UTC+2		Report		Stadium: Ullevaal Stadion; Attendance: 26.659; Referee: Anthony Taylor (England)

Notes

1. Match was an unofficial friendly, not recognised by FIFA.

=== Sweden national under-21 football team ===
==== 2015 UEFA European Under-21 Championship ====
===== Group stage =====
Pos	Team	Pld	W	D	L	GF	GA	GD	Pts	Group stage result
1	Portugal	3	1	2	0	2	1	+1	5	Advance to knockout stage and 2016 Summer Olympics
2	Sweden	3	1	1	1	3	3	0	4	Advance to knockout stage and 2016 Summer Olympics
3	Italy	3	1	1	1	4	3	+1	4	
4	England	3	1	0	2	2	4	−2	3	

Source: UEFA
Rules for classification: tie-breaking

Win Draw Loss

18 June 2015 Group A	Italy	1–2	Sweden	Olomouc, Czech Republic
18:00 CEST (UTC+02:00)	Berardi 29' (pen.)	Report	Guidetti 56'; Kiese Thelin 86' (pen.)	Stadium: Andrův stadion Attendance: 6,719; Referee: Anastasios Sidiropoulos (Greece)

21 June 2015 Group A	Sweden	0–1	England	Olomouc, Czech Republic
18:00 CEST (UTC+02:00)		Report	Lingard 85'	Stadium: Andrův stadion Attendance: 11,257; Referee: Javier Estrada Fernández (Spain)

24 June 2015 Group A	Portugal	1–1	Sweden	Uherské Hradiště, Czech Republic
20:45 CEST (UTC+02:00)	Paciência 82'	Report	Tibbling 89'	Stadium: Stadion Miroslava Valenty; Attendance: 7,263; Referee: Clément Turpin (France)

===== Knockout stage =====
Win Draw Loss

27 June 2015 Semi-finals	Denmark	1–4	Sweden	Prague, Czech Republic
21:00 CEST (UTC+02:00)	Bech 63'	Report	Guidetti 23' (pen.); Tibbling 26'; Quaison 83'; Hiljemark 90+5'	Stadium: Generali Arena; Attendance: 9,834; Referee: Sergei Karasev (Russia)

30 June 2015 Final	Sweden	0–0 (a.e.t.) (4–3 p)	Portugal	Prague, Czech Republic
20:45 CEST (UTC+02:00)		Report		Stadium: Eden Arena; Attendance: 18,867; Referee: Szymon Marciniak (Poland)
	Penalties
	Guidetti (penalty scored); Kiese Thelin (penalty scored); Augustinsson (penalty scored); Khalili (penalty missed); Lindelöf (penalty scored)		(penalty scored) Paciência; (penalty scored) Tozé; (penalty missed) Esgaio; (penalty scored) João Mário; (penalty missed) Carvalho

=== Sweden women's national football team ===
==== 2015 FIFA Women's World Cup ====
===== Group stage =====
Pos	Team	Pld	W	D	L	GF	GA	GD	Pts	Qualification
1	United States	3	2	1	0	4	1	+3	7	Advance to knockout stage
2	Australia	3	1	1	1	4	4	0	4	Advance to knockout stage
3	Sweden	3	0	3	0	4	4	0	3	Advance to knockout stage
4	Nigeria	3	0	1	2	3	6	−3	1	

Source: FIFA
Rules for classification: Group stage tiebreakers

Win Draw Loss

8 June 2015 Group D	Sweden	3–3	Nigeria	Winnipeg, Canada
15:00 CDT (UTC−5)	Oparanozie 21' (o.g.); Fischer 31'; Sembrant 60'	Report	Okobi 50'; Oshoala 53'; Ordega 87'	Stadium: Investors Group Field; Referee: Ri Hyang Ok (Korea DPR)

12 June 2015 Group D	United States	0–0	Sweden	Winnipeg, Canada
19:00 CDT (UTC−5)		Report		Stadium: Investors Group Field; Attendance: 32,716; Referee: Sachiko Yamagishi (Japan)

16 June 2015 Group D	Australia	1–1	Sweden	Edmonton, Canada
18:00 MDT (UTC−6)	De Vanna 5'	Report	Jakobsson 15'	Stadium: Commonwealth Stadium; Referee: Lucila Venegas (Mexico)

===== Knockout stage =====
Win Draw Loss

20 June 2015 Round of 16	Germany	4–1	Sweden	Ottawa, Canada
16:00 EDT (UTC−4)	Mittag 24'; Šašić 36' (pen.), 78'; Marozsán 88'	Report	Sembrant 82'	Stadium: TD Place Stadium; Attendance: 22,486; Referee: Ri Hyang Ok (Korea DPR)

==== UEFA Women's Euro 2017 qualifying ====
Pos	Team	Pld	W	D	L	GF	GA	GD	Pts	Qualification	Sweden	Denmark	Poland	Slovakia	Moldova
1	Sweden	8	7	0	1	22	3	+19	21	Final tournament	—	1–0	3–0	2–1	6–0
2	Denmark	8	6	1	1	22	1	+21	19	Final tournament	2–0	—	6–0	4–0	4–0
3	Poland	8	3	1	4	10	16	−6	10		0–4	0–0	—	2–0	4–0
4	Slovakia	8	3	0	5	11	13	−2	9		0–3	0–1	2–1	—	4–0
5	Moldova	8	0	0	8	1	33	−32	0		0–3	0–5	1–3	0–4	—

Source: UEFA
Rules for classification: Qualification tiebreakers

Win Draw Loss

17 September 2015 Euro 2017 Q	Moldova	v	Sweden

22 September 2015 Euro 2017 Q	Sweden	v	Poland	Gothenburg, Sweden
				Stadium: Gamla Ullevi

27 October 2015 Euro 2017 Q	Sweden	v	Denmark	Gothenburg, Sweden
				Stadium: Gamla Ullevi

==== 2015 Algarve Cup ====
Group A

Team	Pld	W	D	L	GF	GA	GD	Pts
Sweden	3	2	0	1	7	4	+3	6
Germany	3	2	0	1	7	5	+2	6
Brazil	3	1	1	1	3	3	0	4
China	3	0	1	2	0	5	−5	1

Ranking of first-placed teams

Pos	Grp	Team	Pld	W	D	L	GF	GA	GD	Pts	Qualification
1	C	France	3	3	0	0	8	2	+6	9	Final
2	B	United States	3	2	1	0	5	1	+4	7	Final
3	A	Sweden	3	2	0	1	7	4	+3	6	Third-place match

Win Draw Loss

4 March 2015 Group A	Germany	2–4	Sweden	Vila Real de Santo António, Portugal
16:00 WET (UTC±0)	Marozsán 2'; Laudehr 3'	Report	Seger 30', 71'; Jakobsson 54', 84'	Stadium: Estádio Municipal; Attendance: 769; Referee: Carina Vitulano (Italy)

6 March 2015 Group A	Sweden	0–2	Brazil	Lagos, Portugal
13:30 WET (UTC±0)		Report	Marta 20'; Andressa 68'	Stadium: Estádio Municipal; Referee: Liang Qin (China)

9 March 2015 Group A	Sweden	3–0	China	Vila Real de Santo António, Portugal
17:30 WET (UTC±0)	Asllani 4'; Schelin 33' (pen.); Jakobsson 40'	Report		Stadium: Estádio Municipal; Referee: Maria Carvajal (Chile)

11 March 2015 Third-place match	Sweden	1–2	Germany	Parchal, Portugal
12:00 WET (UTC±0)	Jakobsson 63'	Report	Mittag 3'; Popp 52'	Stadium: Estádio Municipal da Bela Vista; Referee: Liang Qin (China)

==== Friendlies ====
Win Draw Loss

13 January 2015 Friendly	Norway	2–3	Sweden	La Manga, Spain
18:30 CET (UTC+1)	Herlovsen 26', 33'	Report	Asllani 48', 60'; Schelin 78'	Stadium: La Manga Stadium; Referee: Marta Frias Acwedo (Spain)

12 February 2015 Friendly	Finland	0–3	Sweden	Uusimaa, Finland
16:00 EET (UTC+2)		Report	Schelin 28'; Jakobsson 63'; Fischer 76'	Stadium: Eerikkilä; Attendance: 183; Referee: Kirsi Heikkinen (Finland)

5 April 2015 Friendly	Sweden	1–3	Switzerland	Eskilstuna, Sweden
18:15 CEST (UTC+2)	Schelin 60'	Report	Bachmann 23'; Humm 37'; Bernauer 81'	Stadium: Tunavallen; Attendance: 3,543; Referee: Riem Hussein (Germany)

8 April 2015 Friendly	Sweden	3–3	Denmark	Stockholm, Sweden
17:30 CEST (UTC+2)	Schelin 30', 62'; Seger 67'	Report	Petersson 53'; Nielsen 56'; Harder 90+3'	Stadium: Tele2 Arena; Attendance: 5,154; Referee: Stephanie Frappart (France)

30 May 2015 Friendly	Sweden	2–1	Netherlands	Toronto, Canada
16:00 EDT (UTC−4)	Schelin 53'; Asllani 60'	Report	Melis 43'	Stadium: York Stadium; Referee: Marie-Soleil Beaudoin (Canada)

== Swedish clubs' performance in Europe ==
These are the results of the Swedish teams in European competitions during the 2015–16 season. (Swedish team score displayed first)

=== Men's football ===
Team	Contest	Round	Opponent	1st leg score	2nd leg score	Aggregate score
Malmö FF	UEFA Champions League	Second qualifying round	(Lithuania) Žalgiris Vilnius	0–0 (H)	1–0 (A)	W 1–0
Malmö FF	UEFA Champions League	Third qualifying round	(Austria) Red Bull Salzburg	0–2 (A)	3–0 (H)	W 3–2
Malmö FF	UEFA Champions League	Play-off round	(Scotland) Celtic	2–3 (A)	2–0 (H)	W 4–3
Malmö FF	UEFA Champions League	Group stage	(Spain) Real Madrid	0–2 (H)	0–8 (A)	None
Malmö FF	UEFA Champions League	Group stage	(France) Paris Saint-Germain	0–2 (H)	0–5 (A)	None
Malmö FF	UEFA Champions League	Group stage	(Ukraine) Shakhtar Donetsk	1–0 (H)	0–4 (A)	None
IFK Göteborg	UEFA Europa League	Second qualifying round	(Poland) Śląsk Wrocław	0–0 (A)	2–0 (H)	W 2–0
IFK Göteborg	UEFA Europa League	Third qualifying round	(Portugal) Belenenses	1–2 (A)	0–0 (H)	L 1–2
AIK	UEFA Europa League	First qualifying round	(Finland) VPS	2–2 (A)	4–0 (H)	W 6–2
AIK	UEFA Europa League	Second qualifying round	(Armenia) Shirak	2–0 (H)	2–0 (A)	W 4–0
AIK	UEFA Europa League	Third qualifying round	(Greece) Atromitos	1–3 (H)	0–1 (A)	L 1–4
IF Elfsborg	UEFA Europa League	First qualifying round	(Finland) Lahti	2–2 (A)	5–0 (H)	W 7–2
IF Elfsborg	UEFA Europa League	Second qualifying round	(Denmark) Randers	0–0 (A)	1–0 (H) (a.e.t.)	W 1–0
IF Elfsborg	UEFA Europa League	Third qualifying round	(Norway) Odd	2–1 (H)	0–2 (A)	L 2–3

=== Women's football ===
Team	Contest	Round	Opponent	1st leg score	2nd leg score	Aggregate score
FC Rosengård	UEFA Women's Champions League	Round of 32	TBD			
KIF Örebro DFF	UEFA Women's Champions League	Round of 32	TBD			
