= 2014 Division 2 (Swedish football) =

Division 2
- Season: 2014
- Champions: Akropolis IF; Carlstad United BK; Eskilsminne IF; FC Höllviken; Piteå IF; Södertälje FK
- Promoted: Akropolis IF; Carlstad United BK; Eskilsminne IF; FC Höllviken; Piteå IF; Södertälje FK
- Relegated: GIF Nike; IF Limhamn Bunkeflo; IFK Åmål; IFK Ölme; Karlbergs BK; KB Karlskoga; Lerums IS; Ljungby IF; Mariehem SK; Morön BK; Råslätts SK; Sandviks IK; Sävedalens IF; Smedby AIS; Spårvägens FF; Värmbols FC
- Matches: 2,184
- Goals: 3,715 (1.7 per match)

The 2014 Division 2, part of the 2014 Swedish football season, was the 9th season of Sweden's fourth-tier football league in its current format. The season started on 12 April 2014 and ended on 11 October 2014. The teams promoted to Division 1 were: Piteå IF, Akropolis IF, Södertälje FK, Carlstad United BK, FC Höllviken, and Eskilsminne IF.

== Teams ==
Location of teams of the 2014 Division 2 teams.
Red: Norrland; Blue: Norra Svealand; Green: Södra Svealand; Yellow: Norra Götaland; Orange: Östra Götaland; Purple: Västra Götaland.
Location of teams of the 2014 Division 2 Stockholm County teams.
Blue: Norra Svealand; Green: Södra Svealand.
Location of teams of the 2014 Division 2 Greater Gothenburg teams.
Yellow: Norra Götaland; Purple: Västra Götaland.
Location of teams of the 2014 Division 2 Skåne County teams.
Orange: Östra Götaland. Purple: Västra Götaland.

=== Division 2 Norrland ===
- Anundsjö IF
- Bodens BK FF
- Hudiksvalls FF
- Härnösands FF
- IFK Östersund
- Mariehem SK
- Morön BK
- Piteå IF
- Sandvikens IF
- Sandviks IK
- Selånger FK
- Söderhamns FF
- Tegs SK
- Ånge IF

Source - Results & League Table 2014:
svenskfotboll.se

=== Division 2 Norra Svealand ===
- Akropolis IF
- BKV Norrtälje
- Gamla Upsala SK
- IFK Aspudden-Tellus
- Karlbergs BK
- Konyaspor KIF
- Kvarnsvedens IK
- Skiljebo SK
- Sollentuna FF
- Spårvägens FF
- Strömsbergs IF
- Syrianska IF Kerburan
- Värmdö IF
- Västerås IK

Source – Results & League Table 2014:
svenskfotboll.se

=== Division 2 Södra Svealand ===
- Arameisk-Syrianska IF
- Ekerö IK
- Enskede IK
- Eskilstuna Södra FF
- FC Gute
- FC Linköping City
- IK Sleipner
- Karlslunds IF HFK
- KB Karlskoga FF
- Nacka FF
- Rynninge IK
- Smedby AIS
- Södertälje FK
- Värmbols FC

Source – Results & League Table 2014:
svenskfotboll.se

=== Division 2 Norra Götaland ===
- Carlstad United BK
- Grebbestads IF
- IFK Åmål
- IFK Ölme
- IK Gauthiod
- Karlstad BK
- Lerums IS
- Lidköpings FK
- Lärje-Angereds IF
- Nordvärmland FF
- Stenungsunds IF
- Tibro AIK FK
- Torslanda IK
- Ytterby IS

Source – Results & League Table 2014:
svenskfotboll.se

=== Division 2 Östra Götaland ===
- Asarums IF FK
- BW 90 IF
- FC Höllviken
- FC Rosengård 1917
- FK Karlskrona
- Hässleholms IF
- IF Limhamn Bunkeflo
- IFK Berga
- KSF Prespa Birlik
- Kvarnby IK
- Lindsdals IF
- Ljungby IF
- Nosaby IF
- Vimmerby IF

Source – Results & League Table 2014:
svenskfotboll.se

=== Division 2 Västra Götaland ===
- Assyriska BK
- Dalstorps IF
- Eskilsminne IF
- GIF Nike
- Helsingborgs IF Akademi
- Högaborgs BK
- Höganäs BK
- Jonsereds IF
- Lindome GIF
- Råslätts SK
- Sävedalens IF
- Tenhults IF
- Torns IF
- Tvååkers IF

Source – Results & League Table 2014:
svenskfotboll.se

== League tables ==
=== Division 2 Norrland ===
Pos	Team	Pld	W	D	L	GF	GA	GD	Pts	Qualification or relegation
1	Piteå IF	26	17	6	3	63	21	+42	57	Promotion to 2015 Division 1
2	Hudiksvalls FF	26	13	8	5	42	27	+15	47	
3	Anundsjö IF	26	12	8	6	52	39	+13	44	
4	Sandvikens IF	26	13	5	8	47	35	+12	44	
5	Ånge IF	26	11	9	6	40	28	+12	42	
6	Tegs SK	26	12	5	9	49	34	+15	41	
7	IFK Östersund	26	10	9	7	50	40	+10	39	
8	Bodens BK	26	11	6	9	46	38	+8	39	
9	Härnösands FF	26	10	5	11	41	40	+1	35	
10	Söderhamns FF	26	8	7	11	42	44	−2	31	
11	Selånger FK	26	9	4	13	47	52	−5	31	
12	Mariehems SK	26	6	4	16	29	64	−35	22	Relegation play-offs
13	Sandviks IK	26	5	3	18	24	58	−34	18	2015 Division 3
14	Morön BK	26	4	3	19	24	76	−52	15	2015 Division 3

Source: http://www.everysport.com/sport/fotboll/fotbollsserier-2014/division-2-herr/norrland/63933
Rules for classification: 1) points; 2) goal difference; 3) number of goals scored; 4) head-to-head points; 5) head-to-head goal difference; 6) head-to-head away goals scored

=== Division 2 Norra Svealand ===
Pos	Team	Pld	W	D	L	GF	GA	GD	Pts	Qualification or relegation
1	Akropolis IF	26	18	7	1	68	18	+50	61	Promotion to 2015 Division 1
2	Gamla Upsala SK	26	14	10	2	54	30	+24	52	
3	Sollentuna FF	26	15	5	6	59	26	+33	50	
4	BKV Norrtälje	26	13	5	8	56	33	+23	44	
5	Syrianska IF Kerburan	26	13	4	9	56	37	+19	43	
6	IFK Aspudden-Tellus	26	12	7	7	44	40	+4	43	
7	Värmdö IF	26	11	5	10	51	48	+3	38	
8	Skiljebo SK	26	10	3	13	54	54	0	33	
9	Konyaspor KIF	26	8	8	10	35	48	−13	32	
10	Västerås IK	26	7	9	10	42	52	−10	30	
11	Kvarnsvedens IK	26	6	10	10	35	45	−10	28	
12	Strömsbergs IF	26	6	7	13	39	68	−29	25	Relegation play-offs
13	Karlbergs BK	26	5	3	18	31	61	−30	18	2015 Division 3
14	Spårvägens FF	26	1	3	22	20	84	−64	6	2015 Division 3

Source: http://www.everysport.com/sport/fotboll/fotbollsserier-2014/division-2-herr/norra-svealand/63930
Rules for classification: 1) points; 2) goal difference; 3) number of goals scored; 4) head-to-head points; 5) head-to-head goal difference; 6) head-to-head away goals scored

=== Division 2 Södra Svealand ===
Pos	Team	Pld	W	D	L	GF	GA	GD	Pts	Qualification or relegation
1	Södertälje FK	26	19	2	5	68	31	+37	59	Promotion to 2015 Division 1
2	IK Sleipner	26	18	3	5	64	27	+37	57	
3	Enskede IK	26	17	3	6	66	28	+38	54	
4	Nacka FF	26	15	7	4	51	30	+21	52	
5	Eskilstuna City FK	26	14	4	8	46	37	+9	46	
6	Ekerö IK	26	13	2	11	55	44	+11	41	
7	Rynninge IK	26	12	2	12	43	46	−3	38	
8	Arameisk-Syrianska IF	26	10	6	10	44	37	+7	36	
9	FC Linköping City	26	9	4	13	37	46	−9	31	
10	Karlslunds IF	26	7	6	13	30	46	−16	27	
11	FC Gute	26	7	5	14	35	56	−21	26	
12	Smedby AIS	26	4	9	13	25	44	−19	21	Relegation play-offs
13	Värmbols FC	26	4	3	19	16	62	−46	15	2015 Division 3
14	KB Karlskoga	26	3	4	19	27	73	−46	13	2015 Division 3

Source: http://www.everysport.com/sport/fotboll/fotbollsserier-2014/division-2-herr/sdra-svealand/63929
Rules for classification: 1) points; 2) goal difference; 3) number of goals scored; 4) head-to-head points; 5) head-to-head goal difference; 6) head-to-head away goals scored

=== Division 2 Norra Götaland ===
Pos	Team	Pld	W	D	L	GF	GA	GD	Pts	Qualification or relegation
1	Carlstad United BK	26	19	5	2	61	28	+33	62	Promotion to 2015 Division 1
2	IK Gauthiod	26	15	4	7	60	38	+22	49	
3	Nordvärmland FF	26	12	8	6	47	34	+13	44	
4	Grebbestads IF	26	13	2	11	49	43	+6	41	
5	Lärje/Angereds IF	26	12	4	10	40	34	+6	40	
6	Lidköpings FK	26	10	6	10	45	41	+4	36	
7	Torslanda IK	26	9	6	11	36	34	+2	33	
8	Karlstad BK	26	10	3	13	36	41	−5	33	
9	Ytterby IS	26	9	5	12	50	63	−13	32	
10	Tibro AIK	26	8	7	11	37	47	−10	31	
11	Stenungsunds IF	26	9	4	13	31	48	−17	31	
12	IFK Åmål	26	9	3	14	41	48	−7	30	Relegation play-offs
13	IFK Ölme	26	7	6	13	40	48	−8	27	2015 Division 3
14	Lerums IS	26	7	3	16	31	57	−26	24	2015 Division 3

Source: http://www.everysport.com/sport/fotboll/fotbollsserier-2014/division-2-herr/norra-gtaland/63932
Rules for classification: 1) points; 2) goal difference; 3) number of goals scored; 4) head-to-head points; 5) head-to-head goal difference; 6) head-to-head away goals scored

=== Division 2 Östra Götaland ===
Pos	Team	Pld	W	D	L	GF	GA	GD	Pts	Qualification or relegation
1	FC Höllviken	26	18	3	5	55	25	+30	57	Promotion to 2015 Division 1
2	FC Rosengård 1917	26	17	4	5	51	29	+22	55	
3	FK Karlskrona	26	14	5	7	51	31	+20	47	
4	IFK Berga	26	13	5	8	35	26	+9	44	
5	Vimmerby IF	26	11	4	11	43	43	0	37	
6	Asarums IF	26	9	8	9	40	32	+8	35	
7	Hässleholms IF	26	8	9	9	41	32	+9	33	
8	BW 90 IF	26	10	3	13	48	49	−1	33	
9	Kvarnby IK	26	10	3	13	41	51	−10	33	
10	Lindsdals IF	26	9	6	11	45	56	−11	33	
11	KSF Prespa Birlik	26	9	5	12	39	50	−11	32	
12	Nosaby IF	26	7	5	14	43	60	−17	26	Relegation play-offs
13	Ljungby IF	26	6	6	14	28	48	−20	24	2015 Division 3
14	IF Limhamn Bunkeflo	26	3	10	13	25	53	−28	19	2015 Division 3

Source: http://www.everysport.com/sport/fotboll/fotbollsserier-2014/division-2-herr/oestra-goetaland/63931
Rules for classification: 1) points; 2) goal difference; 3) number of goals scored; 4) head-to-head points; 5) head-to-head goal difference; 6) head-to-head away goals scored

=== Division 2 Västra Götaland ===
Pos	Team	Pld	W	D	L	GF	GA	GD	Pts	Qualification or relegation
1	Eskilsminne IF	26	17	5	4	78	29	+49	56	Promotion to 2015 Division 1
2	Tvååkers IF	26	17	2	7	72	33	+39	53	
3	Torns IF	26	17	2	7	47	37	+10	53	
4	Assyriska BK	26	13	7	6	43	34	+9	46	
5	Högaborgs BK	26	12	3	11	41	34	+7	39	
6	Helsingborgs IF Akademi	26	11	4	11	46	47	−1	37	
7	Dalstorps IF	26	9	8	9	53	36	+17	35	
8	Lindome GIF	26	9	7	10	44	50	−6	34	
9	Jonsereds IF	26	10	4	12	38	47	−9	34	
10	Höganäs BK	26	9	6	11	59	51	+8	33	
11	Tenhults IF	26	10	2	14	50	67	−17	32	
12	GIF Nike	26	7	4	15	39	62	−23	25	Relegation play-offs
13	Råslätts SK	26	7	3	16	44	75	−31	24	2015 Division 3
14	Sävedalens IF	26	4	3	19	25	77	−52	15	2015 Division 3

Source: http://www.everysport.com/sport/fotboll/fotbollsserier-2014/division-2-herr/vaestra-goetaland/63934
Rules for classification: 1) points; 2) goal difference; 3) number of goals scored; 4) head-to-head points; 5) head-to-head goal difference; 6) head-to-head away goals scored

=== Relegation play-offs ===
==== First round ====
The first legs were played on 8 October, and the second legs were played on 11 and 12 October 2014.

Team 1	Agg.	Team 2	1st leg	2nd leg
Gällivare Malmbergets FF	3–4	Friska Viljor FC	3–0	1–3
Avesta AIK	2–1	Sala FF	1–0	1–1
Myresjö/Vetlanda FK	2–5	IFK Osby	1–2	1–3
IFK Malmö	6–1	Stafsinge IF	5–1	1–1
Kortedala IF	3–2	IFK Falköping	1–0	2–2
Sundbybergs IK	2–5	IFK Stockholm	1–4	1–1

==== Second round ====
The first legs were played on 18 and 19 October, and the second legs were played on 25 and 26 October 2014.

Team 1	Agg.	Team 2	1st leg	2nd leg
Gällivare Malmbergets FF	4–2	Mariehem SK	2–0	2–2
IFK Stockholm	4–2	Smedby AIS	3–1	1–1
Kortedala IF	6–4	IFK Åmål	0–1	6–3
IFK Osby	2–4	Nosaby IF	0–1	2–3
IFK Malmö	7–4	GIF Nike	5–0	2–4
Avesta AIK	1–5	Strömsbergs IF	0–3	1–2 (Note: Match abandoned after 77 minutes of play. On 29 October 2014, the competition committee of Swedish Football Association decided the match would with the score 2–1.)

== Player of the year awards ==
Ever since 2003 the online bookmaker Unibet have given out awards at the end of the season to the best players in Division 2. The recipients are decided by a jury of sportsjournalists, coaches and football experts. The names highlighted in green won the overall national award.

Norrland
Position	Player	Club
GK	(Sweden) Niclas Larsson	Hudiksvalls FF
DF	(Sweden) William Olausson	Piteå IF
MF	(Sweden) Mehmed Hafizovic	Hudiksvalls FF
FW	(Sweden) Jonathan Lundbäck	IFK Östersund

Norra Svealand
Position	Player	Club
GK	(Sweden) Simon Lundgren	Akropolis IF
DF	(Sweden) Jesper Nyholm	Gamla Upsala SK
MF	(Sweden) Emil Skogh	BKV Norrtälje
FW	(Sweden) Marcus Hägg	Strömsbergs IF

Södra Svealand
Position	Player	Club
GK	(Sweden) Nicklas Bergh	Eskilstuna City FK
DF	(Sweden) Calle Klinton	Rynninge IK
MF	(Sweden) Riki Cakić	IK Sleipner
FW	(Sweden) Fredrik Notice	Södertälje SK

Östra Götaland
Position	Player	Club
GK	(Sweden) Marcus Eskilsson	FC Höllviken
DF	(Sweden) Magnus Carlsson	FC Höllviken
MF	(Sweden) Muktar Ahmed	FK Karlskrona
FW	(Sweden) Joel Wedenell	Hässleholms IF

Västra Götaland
Position	Player	Club
GK	(Sweden) Nikola Stojilkovic	Eskilsminne IF
DF	(Sweden) Benjamin Omerovic	Tenhults IF
MF	(Sweden) Robin Book	Eskilsminne IF
FW	(Sweden) Samuel Aziz	Höganäs BK

Norra Götaland
Position	Player	Club
GK	(Sweden) Mathias Karlsson	Carlstad United BK
DF	(Sweden) Johan Falkman	Karlstad BK
MF	(Sweden) Markus Svensson	Grebbestads IF
FW	(Sweden) Jonas Henriksson	Grebbestads IF
