= Heradi Rashidi =

Congolese footballer

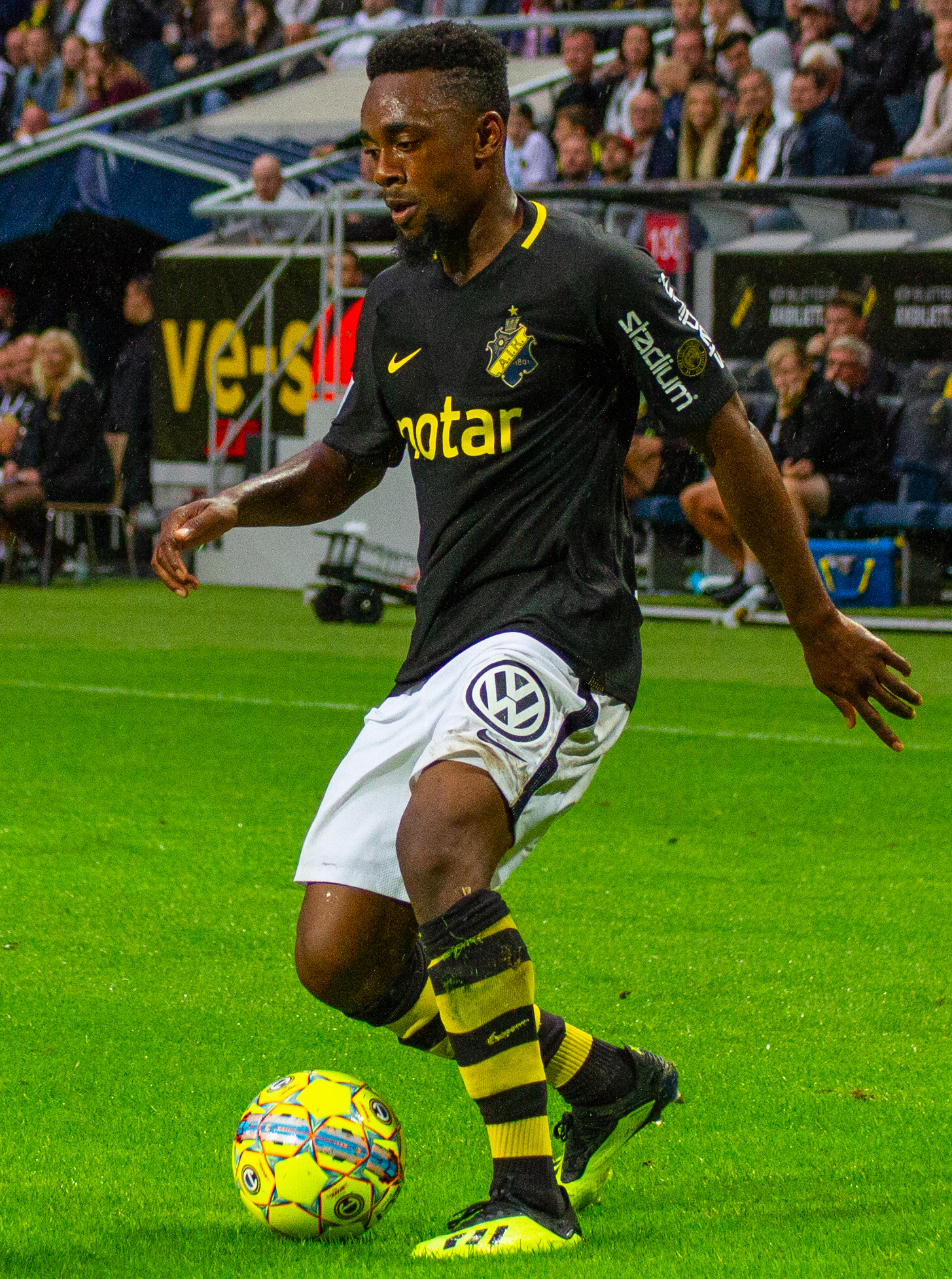

Personal information
- Date of birth: 24 July 1994 (age 32)
- Place of birth: Gbadolite, Zaire
- Height: 1.74 m (5 ft 8 1/2 in)
- Position: Wing-back

Team information
- Current team: Brommapojkarna
- Number: 24

Youth career
- Djurgårdens IF
- IFK Stockholm
- IFK Aspudden-Tellus
- IF Brommapojkarna

Senior career*
Years	Team	Apps	(Gls)
2014	Akropolis IF	24	(12)
2015	Södertälje FK	26	(11)
2016–2018	Dalkurd FF	45	(3)
2016	→ Syrianska FC (loan)	14	(2)
2018–2020	AIK	47	(2)
2021	Ararat-Armenia	6	(0)
2022–	Brommapojkarna	0	(0)
- * Club domestic league appearances and goals as of 2 April 2022

Heradi Rashidi (born 24 July 1994) is a Swedish footballer who plays for Brommapojkarna. Previously mainly a right winger or forward, since 2016 he has mainly operated as left wing-back.

== Club career ==
On 4 July 2018, it was announced that AIK had acquired Rashidi from Dalkurd for an undisclosed fee.

On 15 July 2018, Rashidi made his debut for AIK against GIF Sundsvall away. In the last minute of added time he scored the only goal of the game, a beautiful shot in the top left corner.

On 22 January 2021, Rashidi signed for Armenian club Ararat-Armenia making seven appearances for them in all competitions before leaving the club in June 2021 when his contract wasn't renewed.

On 14 February 2022, Rashidi signed with Brommapojkarna in Superettan.

== Career statistics ==
=== Club ===
As of 11 November 2018.

Club	Season	League			Cup		Continental		Other		Total	
Club	Season	Division	Apps	Goals	Apps	Goals	Apps	Goals	Apps	Goals	Apps	Goals
Akropolis IF	2014	Division 2	24	12	1 (Note: Appearances in the Svenska Cupen)	1	–		0	0	25	13
Södertälje FK	2015	Division 1	26	11	1	0	–		0	0	27	11
Dalkurd FF	2016	Superettan	12	0	0	0	–		0	0	12	0
Syrianska FC (loan)	2016	Superettan	14	2	0	0	–		2 (Note: Appearances in the Superettan Playoffs)	0	16	2
Dalkurd FF	2017	Superettan	28	3	4	1	–		0	0	32	4
Dalkurd FF	2018	Allsvenskan	5	0	3	0	–		0	0	8	0
Dalkurd FF	Total		45	3	7	1	0	0	0	0	52	4
AIK	2018	Allsvenskan	16	1	1	0	2	0	0	0	19	1
AIK	Total		16	1	1	0	2	0	0	0	19	1
Career total			125	29	10	2	2	0	2	0	139	31

== Honours ==
AIK

- Allsvenskan: 2018
