= 2015 Superettan =

Superettan
- Season: 2015
- Champions: Jönköpings Södra IF
- Promoted: Jönköpings Södra IF; Östersunds FK
- Relegated: Mjällby AIF; Utsiktens BK; IF Brommapojkarna
- Matches played: 240
- Goals scored: 611 (2.55 per match)
- Top goalscorer: Fredrik Olsson (17 goals)
- Biggest home win: Assyriska FF 7–1 Utsiktens BK (19 July 2015)
- Biggest away win: Ängelholms FF 0–4 IK Frej (2 May 2015)
- Highest scoring: Assyriska FF 7–1 Utsiktens BK (19 July 2015)
- Longest winning run: 5 matches Jönköpings Södra IF
- Longest unbeaten run: 13 matches IK Sirius
- Longest winless run: 12 matches IK Frej
- Longest losing run: 7 matches Mjällby AIF
- Highest attendance: 6,544; Östersunds FK 2–0 Ljungskile SK (1 November 2015)
- Lowest attendance: 100; AFC United 2–0 Utsiktens BK (25 April 2015)
- Total attendance: 389,604
- Average attendance: 1,623

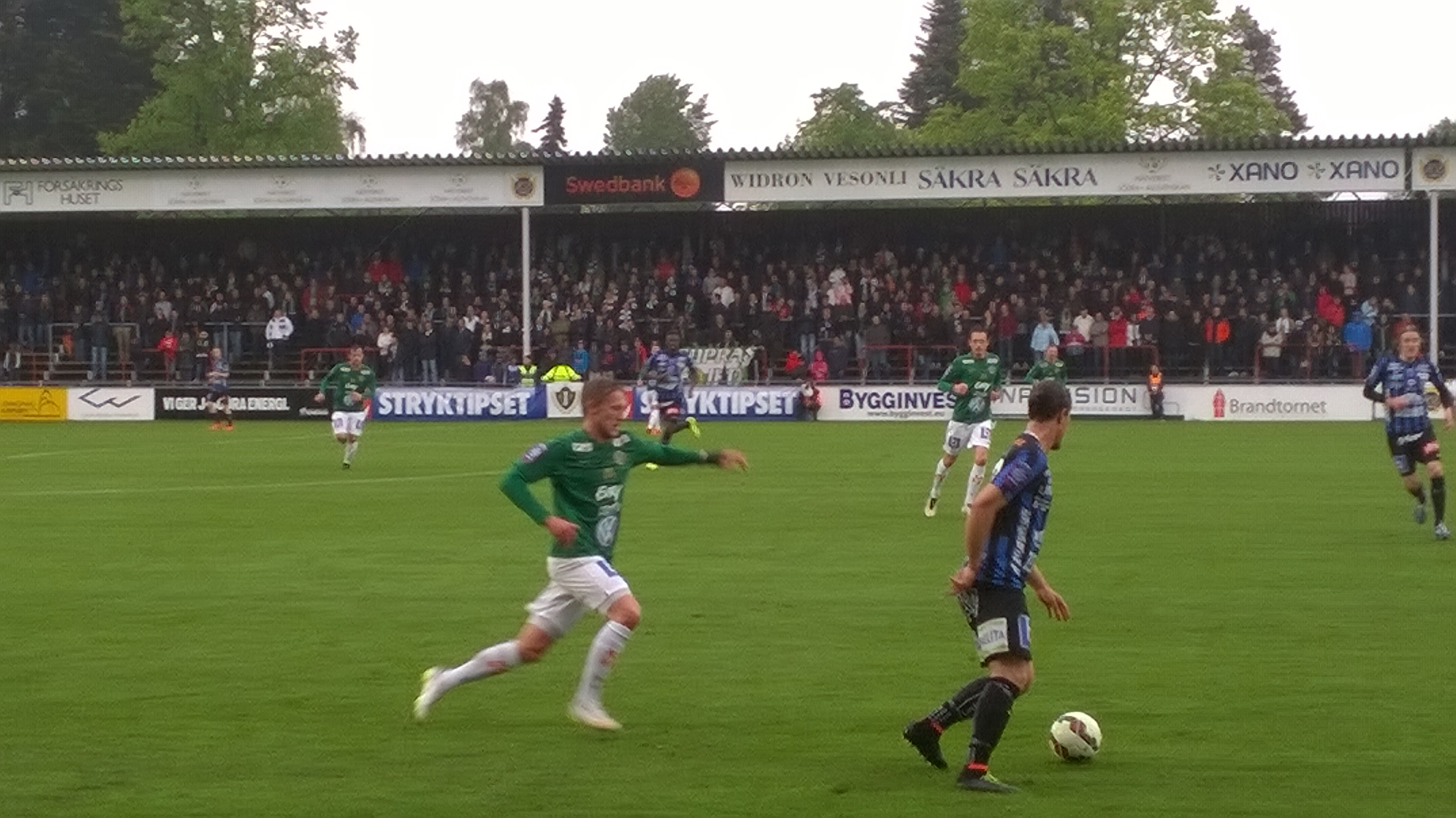
The game Jönköpings Södra IF-IK Sirius (1-1) at Stadsparksvallen in Jönköping. 2 June 2015.

The 2015 Superettan, part of the 2015 Swedish football season, was the 16th season of Superettan, Sweden's second-tier football league in its current format. The 2015 fixtures were released in December 2014. The season began on 3 April 2015 and ended on 1 November 2015. A total of 16 teams contested the league.

== Teams ==
A total of 16 teams contest the league. The top two teams qualify directly for promotion to Allsvenskan, the third has to play a play-off against the fourteenth team from Allsvenskan to decide who will play in Allsvenskan 2016. The bottom two teams qualified directly for relegation to Division 1, the thirteenth and the fourteenth has to play a play-off against the numbers two teams from Division 1 Södra and Division 1 Norra to decide who will play in Superettan 2016.

2014-champions Hammarby IF and runner-up GIF Sundsvall were promoted to the Allsvenskan at the end of the 2014 season. They were replaced by Mjällby AIF and IF Brommapojkarna. Landskrona BoIS and Husqvarna FF were relegated at the end of the 2014 season after finishing in the bottom two places of the table. They were replaced by Division 1 Norra champions AFC United and Division 1 Södra champions Utsiktens BK. Östers IF was also relegated after losing the relegation play-offs to Division 1 Norra runner-up IK Frej.

=== Stadia and locations ===
Locations of the 2015 Superettan teams

Team	Location	Stadium	Turf^{1}	Stadium capacity^{1}
AFC United	Stockholm	Skytteholms IP	Artificial	3,500
Assyriska FF	Södertälje	Södertälje Fotbollsarena	Artificial	6,700
Degerfors IF	Degerfors	Stora Valla	Natural	7,500
GAIS	Gothenburg	Gamla Ullevi	Natural	18,416
IF Brommapojkarna	Stockholm	Grimsta IP	Artificial	5,500
IFK Värnamo	Värnamo	Finnvedsvallen	Natural	5,000
IK Frej	Täby	Vikingavallen	Artificial	1,250
IK Sirius	Uppsala	Studenternas IP	Natural	6,300
Jönköpings Södra IF	Jönköping	Stadsparksvallen	Natural	5,500
Ljungskile SK	Ljungskile	Uddevalla Arena	Natural	5,500
Mjällby AIF	Hällevik	Strandvallen	Natural	6,750
Syrianska FC	Södertälje	Södertälje Fotbollsarena	Artificial	6,100
Utsiktens BK	Gothenburg	Ruddalens IP	Artificial	5,000
Varbergs BoIS	Varberg	Påskbergsvallen	Natural	4,500
Ängelholms FF	Ängelholm	Ängelholms IP	Natural	4,000
Östersunds FK	Östersund	Jämtkraft Arena	Artificial	6,400

- ^{1} According to each club information page at the Swedish Football Association website for Superettan.

=== Personnel and kits ===
Note: Flags indicate national team as has been defined under FIFA eligibility rules. Players and Managers may hold more than one non-FIFA nationality.

Team	Head coach^{1}	Captain	Kit manufacturer	Main shirt sponsor
AFC United	(Sweden) Özcan Melkemichel	(United States) Josh Wicks	Nike	Busmarket Sweden
Assyriska FF	(Bosnia and Herzegovina) Valentic Azrudin	(Sweden) Linus Malmborg	Nike	Scania
Degerfors IF	(Sweden) Patrik Werner	(Sweden) Tobias Solberg	Adidas	Outokumpu
GAIS	(Sweden) Per-Ola Ljung	(Sweden) Kenneth Gustafsson	Hummel	Åbro
IF Brommapojkarna	(Iceland) Magni Fannberg	(Sweden) Jacob Une Larsson	Adidas	Åbro
IFK Värnamo	(Sweden) Jörgen Petersson (Sweden) Peter Johansson	(Sweden) Martin Claesson	Puma	Various
IK Frej	(Sweden) Bartosz Grzelak	(Sweden) Johannes Gustafsson	Erreà	Daymark
IK Sirius	(Sweden) Kim Bergstrand	(Sweden) Niklas Busch Thor	Nike	Various
Jönköpings Södra IF	(Sweden) Jimmy Thelin	(Sweden) Tommy Thelin	Nike	Various
Ljungskile SK	(Sweden) Tor-Arne Fredheim	(Sweden) Markus Gustafsson	Adidas	Various
Mjällby AIF	(Sweden) Anders Linderoth	(Sweden) Mattias Asper	Puma	Various
Syrianska FC	(Sweden) Nemanja Miljanović	(Syria) Louay Chanko	Nike	Aros Kapital
Utsiktens BK	(Sweden) Janne Carlsson	(Sweden) Robin Jonsson	Erreà	Prioritet Finans
Varbergs BoIS	(Sweden) Jörgen Wålemark	(Sweden) Robin Tranberg	Umbro	Various
Ängelholms FF	(Sweden) Joakim Persson	(Sweden) Albin Nilsson	Adidas	ScandStick
Östersunds FK	(England) Graham Potter	(Montserrat) Alex Dyer	Adidas	Various

=== Managerial changes ===
Team	Outgoing manager	Manner of departure	Date of vacancy	Table	Incoming manager	Date of appointment
IF Brommapojkarna	(Sweden) Stefan Billborn	Sacked	3 November 2014	Pre-season	(Iceland) Magni Fannberg	11 November 2014

== League table ==
Pos	Team	Pld	W	D	L	GF	GA	GD	Pts	Promotion, qualification or relegation
1	Jönköpings Södra IF (C, P)	30	19	6	5	54	28	+26	63	Promotion to Allsvenskan
2	Östersunds FK (P)	30	18	8	4	56	25	+31	62	Promotion to Allsvenskan
3	IK Sirius	30	15	13	2	53	25	+28	58	Qualification to Promotion playoffs
4	Assyriska FF	30	14	5	11	46	37	+9	47	
5	Varbergs BoIS	30	12	11	7	34	27	+7	47	
6	Ljungskile SK	30	11	10	9	44	37	+7	43	
7	Syrianska FC	30	11	10	9	37	30	+7	43	
8	AFC United	30	10	10	10	43	44	−1	40	
9	Degerfors IF	30	10	8	12	36	38	−2	38	
10	IFK Värnamo	30	10	8	12	37	40	−3	38	
11	GAIS	30	10	5	15	37	44	−7	35	
12	Ängelholms FF	30	8	9	13	31	47	−16	33	
13	Mjällby AIF (R)	30	8	6	16	23	43	−20	30	Qualification to Relegation playoffs
14	IK Frej (O)	30	7	8	15	22	44	−22	29	Qualification to Relegation playoffs
15	Utsiktens BK (R)	30	7	5	18	28	56	−28	26	Relegation to Division 1
16	IF Brommapojkarna (R)	30	5	8	17	30	46	−16	23	Relegation to Division 1

Source: svenskfotboll.se (in Swedish)
Rules for classification: 1) Points; 2) Goal difference; 3) Number of goals scored; 4) Head-to-head points; 5) Head-to-head goal difference; 6) Head-to-head away goals scored
(C) Champions; (O) Play-off winners; (P) Promoted; (R) Relegated

=== Playoffs ===
The 13th-placed and 14th-placed teams of Superettan meets the two runners-up from 2015 Division 1 (Norra and Södra) in Two-legged ties on a home-and-away basis with the team from Superettan finishing at home.

5 November 2015
18:30

Örgryte IS	1 – 0	Mjällby AIF
Paulson 60'	Report

Gamla Ullevi, Gothenburg
Attendance: 5,809
Referee: Nermin Cisic (Värnamo)
8 November 2015
15:00

Mjällby AIF	1 – 1 a.e.t.	Örgryte IS
Terzić 83'	Report	Sahlin 104'

Strandvallen, Hällevik
Attendance: 3,522
Referee: Kaspar Sjöberg (Malmö)

Örgryte IS won 2–1 on aggregate.

5 November 2015
18:30

Akropolis IF	0 – 1	IK Frej
	Report	Lallet 7'

Akalla BP, Stockholm
Referee: Lars Olsson (Umeå)
8 November 2015
15:00

IK Frej	1 – 0	Akropolis IF
Lallet 72'	Report

Vikingavallen, Täby
Referee: Per Melin (Kävlinge)

IK Frej won 2–0 on aggregate.

=== Positions by round ===
Team ╲ Round	1	2	3	4	5	6	7	8	9	10	11	12	13	14	15	16	17	18	19	20	21	22	23	24	25	26	27	28	29	30
Jönköpings Södra IF	4	2	1	1	1	1	1	1	1	1	1	1	1	1	1	1	1	1	1	1	1	1	1	1	1	1	1	1	1	1
Östersunds FK	6	1	2	5	5	3	3	3	2	2	2	2	2	2	2	2	2	2	2	2	2	2	2	2	2	2	2	2	2	2
IK Sirius	9	3	5	4	4	7	5	5	4	4	4	4	4	5	5	3	3	3	3	3	3	3	3	3	3	3	3	3	3	3
Assyriska FF	2	4	3	2	2	5	7	7	8	8	8	7	7	8	8	7	8	6	7	7	6	5	6	4	6	6	5	4	4	4
Varbergs BoIS	5	9	4	3	3	2	2	2	3	3	3	3	3	4	4	5	5	4	5	6	7	7	7	6	4	4	4	5	5	5
Ljungskile SK	11	8	12	7	6	4	6	4	5	5	6	8	8	7	6	8	7	8	8	8	8	8	8	8	8	7	7	6	6	6
Syrianska FC	10	13	6	9	11	12	10	11	7	7	7	5	5	6	7	6	6	7	6	5	4	6	5	7	5	5	6	7	7	7
AFC United	7	11	10	6	9	8	9	8	9	10	11	9	11	9	9	10	11	9	9	9	10	10	9	9	9	9	9	8	8	8
Degerfors IF	16	15	13	12	8	6	4	6	6	6	5	6	6	3	3	4	4	5	4	4	5	4	4	5	7	8	8	9	9	9
IFK Värnamo	3	6	8	8	12	10	8	9	10	11	9	11	12	13	13	12	12	12	10	11	11	12	12	11	11	11	10	10	10	10
GAIS	12	10	9	10	7	11	13	13	11	13	10	12	10	11	11	9	9	10	11	10	9	9	10	10	10	10	12	12	11	11
Ängelholms FF	15	16	16	16	16	15	14	14	14	15	14	14	14	14	15	15	15	14	13	13	12	11	11	12	12	12	11	11	12	12
Mjällby AIF	8	5	7	11	14	13	15	15	15	14	15	15	15	16	16	16	16	16	15	16	16	15	16	15	13	14	13	13	13	13
IK Frej	14	12	14	14	10	9	11	12	13	9	12	10	9	10	10	11	10	11	12	12	13	13	13	13	14	13	14	14	14	14
Utsiktens BK	1	7	11	13	13	13	12	10	12	12	13	13	13	12	12	13	13	13	14	14	14	16	14	14	15	16	16	16	15	15
IF Brommapojkarna	13	14	15	15	15	16	16	16	16	16	16	16	16	15	14	14	14	15	16	15	15	14	15	16	16	15	15	15	16	16

Promotion to Allsvenskan
Promotion play-offs
Relegation play-offs
Relegation to Division 1

Source: everysport.com (in Swedish)

== Results ==
Home \ Away	AFC	AFF	DIF	GAI	BP	IFKV	IKF	IKS	JSIF	LSK	MAIF	SFC	UBK	VAR	ÄFF	ÖFK
AFC United		3–0	0–2	0–2	3–1	1–1	0–0	2–2	1–5	0–4	0–0	2–3	2–0	3–2	3–0	1–2
Assyriska FF	1–3		2–1	1–0	2–1	0–0	3–1	0–0	2–3	0–0	3–0	2–0	7–1	0–1	3–3	4–2
Degerfors IF	3–1	2–0		0–1	1–1	1–1	4–0	1–1	2–0	0–3	0–1	1–0	1–2	1–1	1–1	0–0
GAIS	1–1	0–2	2–1		2–1	1–3	0–0	2–3	1–2	0–0	4–1	3–0	5–2	0–1	2–2	1–1
IF Brommapojkarna	1–1	2–3	0–2	0–2		2–1	2–1	1–0	1–1	1–2	2–2	0–1	1–0	0–0	1–1	0–1
IFK Värnamo	2–3	3–1	1–3	1–0	2–1		2–1	1–5	1–1	2–1	4–0	0–0	3–2	0–1	1–2	1–0
IK Frej	1–1	0–2	2–2	1–0	0–4	1–0		0–0	0–1	1–0	0–2	2–1	1–0	0–0	0–1	1–1
IK Sirius	1–1	1–0	2–0	5–0	3–1	2–0	2–0		2–0	3–3	1–0	1–0	3–0	2–2	1–0	2–2
Jönköpings Södra IF	2–1	2–0	0–1	1–0	5–2	2–1	2–0	1–1		3–2	2–0	1–0	5–2	3–0	4–0	0–1
Ljungskile SK	0–3	3–2	3–0	3–2	1–0	0–2	1–1	4–3	1–2		2–0	0–0	2–1	1–1	0–0	0–2
Mjällby AIF	1–1	0–1	1–2	1–0	2–1	1–0	1–3	1–2	0–1	0–0		1–2	1–2	2–1	1–2	1–0
Syrianska FC	3–3	0–0	3–0	3–0	0–0	0–0	3–1	0–0	1–1	2–0	4–0		1–1	1–0	1–3	1–1
Utsiktens BK	0–1	0–1	4–1	1–0	1–0	3–0	1–0	1–1	1–2	0–4	0–0	1–4		1–1	0–1	0–2
Varbergs BoIS	1–0	2–0	0–0	2–3	1–1	2–1	5–0	1–1	2–0	1–1	1–2	1–0	0–0		1–0	1–0
Ängelholms FF	0–1	0–2	2–1	1–3	3–1	2–2	0–4	0–2	1–1	3–3	1–1	1–2	1–0	0–1		0–1
Östersunds FK	3–1	3–2	3–2	4–0	2–1	1–1	3–0	1–1	1–1	2–0	1–0	4–1	5–1	4–1	3–0	

Source: svenskfotboll.se (in Swedish)
Legend: Blue = home team win; Yellow = draw; Red = away team win.

== Season statistics ==
=== Top scorers ===
Rank	Player	Club	Goals
1	(Sweden) Fredrik Olsson	Jönköpings Södra IF	17
2	(England) Jamie Hopcutt	Östersunds FK	15
3	(Sweden) Luka Mijaljević	Utsiktens BK	13
3	(Sweden) Peter Samuelsson	Degerfors IF	13
3	(Sweden) Tommy Thelin	Jönköpings Södra IF	13
6	(Sweden) Stefan Silva	IK Sirius	12
7	(Sweden) Mattias Genc	Assyriska FF	10
7	(Bosnia and Herzegovina) Dragan Kapčević	Östersunds FK	10
7	(Nigeria) Chidi Omeje	AFC United	10

=== Top assists ===
Rank	Player	Club	Assists
1	(Sweden) Dženis Kozica	IFK Värnamo	11
2	(Nigeria) Michael Omoh	Östersunds FK	10
2	(Northern Ireland) Daryl Smylie	Jönköpings Södra IF	10
2	(Sweden) Tommy Thelin	Jönköpings Södra IF	10
5	(Sweden) Ken Sema	Ljungskile SK	9
6	(Sweden) Eric Jernberg	Degerfors IF	8
6	(Sweden) Jonas Lindberg	Ljungskile SK	8

=== Top goalkeepers ===
(Minimum of 10 games played)

Rank	Goalkeeper	Club	GP	GA	SV%	CS
1	(Jamaica) Dwayne Miller	Syrianska FC	13	11	79	6
2	(Sweden) Andreas Andersson	IK Sirius	30	25	78	14
2	(United States) Josh Wicks	AFC United	24	28	78	7
4	(Sweden) Tommi Vaiho	GAIS	30	44	76	6
4	(Sweden) Damir Mehić	Jönköpings Södra IF	11	10	76	5
6	(Sweden) Joakim Wulff	Varbergs BoIS	29	26	75	15
6	(Sweden) Mattias Asper	Mjällby AIF	24	30	75	7
6	(Sweden) Oscar Berglund	Ängelholms FF	27	38	75	4
9	(Sweden) August Strömberg	Degerfors IF	29	36	73	9

=== Hat-tricks ===
Player	For	Against	Result	Date
(Sweden) Mattias Genc	Assyriska FF	IK Frej	3–1	26 April 2015
(Nigeria) Michael Omoh	Östersunds FK	Syrianska FC	4–1	5 May 2015
(Sweden) Gabriel Altemark-Vanneryr	Ljungskile SK	IK Sirius	4–3	6 May 2015
(Sweden) Peter Samuelsson	Degerfors IF	IK Frej	4–0	9 May 2015
(Nigeria) Chidi Omeje	AFC United	Ljungskile SK	0–3	1 August 2015
(Nigeria) Nsima Peter	Varbergs BoIS	IK Frej	5–0	1 August 2015
(Netherlands) Othman El Kabir	AFC United	IFK Värnamo	2–3	16 August 2015
(Sweden) Hannes Stiller	Ljungskile SK	Ängelholms FF	3–3	23 August 2015
(England) Jamie Hopcutt	Östersunds FK	Utsiktens BK	5–1	24 August 2015
(Sweden) Tommy Thelin	Jönköpings Södra IF	Utsiktens BK	5–2	1 November 2015
