= Daniel Boateng =

English footballer (born 1992)

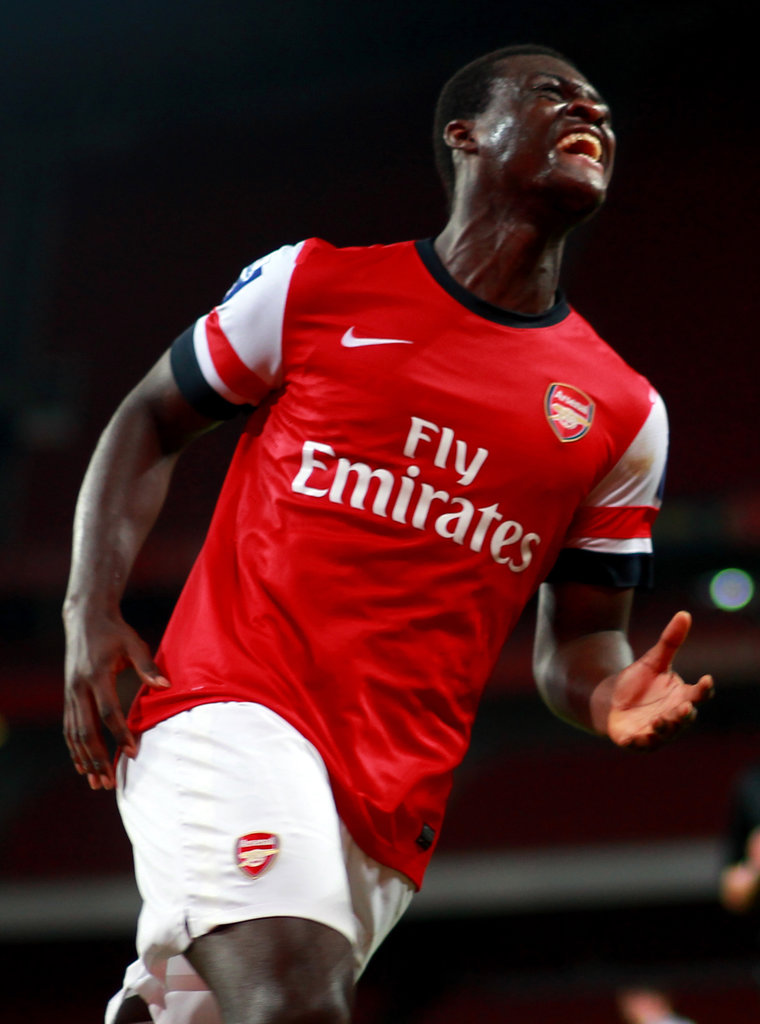
- Boateng in 2013

Personal information
- Full name: Daniel Jesse Boateng
- Date of birth: 2 September 1992 (age 34)
- Place of birth: Enfield, England
- Position: Defender

Youth career
- 2003–2010: Arsenal

Senior career*
Years	Team	Apps	(Gls)
2010–2014	Arsenal	0	(0)
2012	→ Swindon Town (loan)	2	(0)
2012–2013	→ Oxford United (loan)	2	(0)
2014	→ Hibernian (loan)	3	(0)
2015	Södertälje FK	10	(0)
2016–2017	Airdrieonians	20	(0)
2017	Raków Częstochowa	12	(0)
2018	Olimpia Grudziądz	3	(0)
2019	Aerostar Bacău	2	(0)
2020	Welling United	3	(0)
2022	Haringey Borough	1	(0)
Total		59	(0)
- * Club domestic league appearances and goals as of 1 June 2019

Daniel Jesse Boateng (/ˈboʊtɛŋ/ BOH-teng; born 2 September 1992) is an English former footballer who played as a defender. Boateng played for Arsenal, Swindon Town, Oxford United, Hibernian, Södertälje FK, Airdrieonians, Raków Częstochowa and Olimpia Grudziądz. He was born in England and is of Ghanaian descent.

== Club career ==
=== Arsenal ===
Boateng joined the youth academy of Arsenal in September 2003 and progressed through the ranks. On 20 July 2009, he made his reserves debut in a friendly against Lincoln City. He signed a professional contract with Arsenal in July 2010. He made his competitive first team debut for Arsenal in the League Cup against Bolton Wanderers on 25 October 2011.

During the 2011–12 season, Boateng was named as captain occasionally for Arsenal's reserve side. At the end of the 2013–14 season, Boateng was released by Arsenal upon expiry of his contract.

==== Loan spells ====
During summer 2011, Boateng was expected to join Swindon Town, but the move broke down. On 21 January 2012, he then did make the move, signing on loan until the end of the 2011–12 season. Boateng said he joined Swindon to play under manager Paolo Di Canio. A month after signing, Boateng made his debut for the club, as Swindon won 2–1 against Hereford United on 21 February 2014. After making two appearances for Swindon, he returned to Arsenal.

At the commencement of the 2012–13 season, Boateng joined Oxford United on a six-month loan deal on 28 August 2012. After being on the bench for the first two games, Boateng made his debut for the club, in a 4–0 loss against Burton Albion on 15 September 2012. After only making two appearances for the club, manager Chris Wilder suggested Boateng needed to improve and hinted that he could end his loan spell early to free up funds. In the winter transfer window, Boateng returned to Arsenal.

On 31 January 2014, Boateng joined Scottish Premiership club Hibernian on loan. Boateng stated the physicality in Scottish Football was nothing he can't handle. He made his Hibs debut, coming on as a substitute for Danny Handling in the 87th minute in a 2–1 win over Ross County on 15 February 2014. He would make just four appearances for the club and left at the end of the season following their relegation to the Scottish Championship.

=== Södertälje ===
On 13 August 2015, Boateng joined Swedish Football Division 1 side Södertälje FK on a contract until the end of the season. On 22 August, he made his league debut, playing the whole match as his side won 3–1 against Motala AIF.

=== Airdrieonians ===
Boateng was announced as an Airdrieonians player on a one-year contract on 4 August 2016, after leaving Södertälje FK. Boateng made 24 appearances for the club before being released in May 2017.

=== Aerostar Bacău ===
On 20 February 2019, he signed a 6-month contract with Romanian Liga II club CS Aerostar Bacău.

== Honours ==
Arsenal

- Premier Academy League: 2009–10

== Club statistics ==
As of match played 18 August 2023

Appearances and goals by club, season and competition
Club	Season	League			National cup		League cup		Other		Total	
Club	Season	Division	Apps	Goals	Apps	Goals	Apps	Goals	Apps	Goals	Apps	Goals
Arsenal	2011–12	Premier League	0	0	0	0	1	0	0	0	1	0
Swindon Town (loan)	2011–12	League Two	2	0	0	0	0	0	0	0	2	0
Oxford United (loan)	2012–13	League Two	2	0	0	0	1	0	2	0	5	0
Hibernian (loan)	2013–14	Scottish Premiership	3	0	0	0	0	0	0	0	3	0
Södertälje FK	2015	Ettan Fotboll	8	0	0	0	0	0	0	0	8	0
Airdrieonians	2016–17	Scottish League One	20	0	1	0	0	0	3	0	24	0
Raków Częstochowa	2017–18	I liga	8	0	1	0	—		—		9	0
Olimpia Grudziądz	2017–18	I liga	3	0	—		—		—		3	0
Aerostar Bacău	2018–19	Liga II	2	0	0	0	—		0	0	2	0
Welling United	2020–21	National League South	3	0	0	0	—		0	0	3	0
Career total			51	0	2	0	2	0	5	0	60	0
