= 2013–14 Hibernian F.C. season =

Hibernian
2013–14 season
- Chairman: Rod Petrie
- Manager: Pat Fenlon (until 1 November); Terry Butcher (from 12 November)
- Stadium: Easter Road
- Scottish Premiership: 11th (relegated)
- League Cup: Quarter-finals
- Scottish Cup: Fifth round
- Europa League: Qualifying Round 2
- Top goalscorer: League: James Collins; Liam Craig (6); All: Liam Craig (9)
- Highest home attendance: 20,106 (v Hearts, 2 January
- Lowest home attendance: 8,277 (v Motherwell, 8 March)
- Average home league attendance: 11,017.100 (up 526)
Home colours	Away colours	Third colours

The 2013–14 season was Hibernian's fifteenth consecutive season in the top flight of the Scottish football league system, having been promoted from the Scottish First Division at the end of the 1998–99 season. Having lost the 2013 Scottish Cup Final to league champions Celtic, Hibs entered the 2013–14 UEFA Europa League, but suffered a Scottish record aggregate defeat against Swedish club Malmö in the second qualifying round. Hibs also competed in the 2013–14 Scottish League Cup but lost to Heart of Midlothian in the quarter-final at Easter Road. Days after that defeat, manager Pat Fenlon resigned and was replaced with Terry Butcher. Hibs were knocked out of the 2013–14 Scottish Cup in the fifth round by Raith Rovers. A long winless run to finish the 2013–14 Scottish Premiership season meant that Hibs finished in 11th place, and they were relegated after a playoff against Hamilton Academical.

== Results and fixtures ==
=== Friendlies ===
With qualifying matches in the 2013–14 UEFA Europa League due to be played in July, Hibs started pre-season training just a few weeks after playing in the 2013 Scottish Cup Final. The club set up a week-long training camp in southern Spain, including two matches.

29 June 2013 Friendly	Dumbarton	1 – 1	Hibernian	The Bet Butler Stadium, Dumbarton
	McKerracher 52'	Scotland on Sunday	Harris 50'	Attendance: 1,000; Referee: E. Anderson

3 July 2013 Friendly	Gibraltar XI	1 – 3	Hibernian	Victoria Stadium, Gibraltar
	Lopez 55'	Scotsman.com	Mullen 10'; Handling 66'; Caldwell 80'	Attendance: 2,000; Referee: Y. Borg

6 July 2013 Friendly	Nottingham Forest	2 – 1	Hibernian	Vila Real de Santo Antonio, Portugal
	Blackstock 27' (pen.); Miller 69'	Hibernian FC	Jones 68'	Referee: S. Piscaretta

12 July 2013 Friendly	Raith Rovers	0 – 0	Hibernian	Stark's Park, Kirkcaldy
		Hibernian FC		Attendance: 2,050; Referee: J. McKendrick

=== Scottish Premiership ===
The 2013–14 Scottish Premiership season began on 3 August 2013 and the fixture list was announced on 19 June. The season got off to a poor start for Hibs, as they lost in their first two league matches, at home to Motherwell and then in the first Edinburgh derby of the season. Hibs then had a better run of form, losing only one of their next eight league matches. At the end of a week in which Hibs lost at home to Aberdeen in the league and Hearts in the 2013–14 Scottish League Cup, manager Pat Fenlon resigned. Assistant manager Jimmy Nicholl was put in caretaker charge of the team until Inverness CT manager Terry Butcher was recruited to replace Fenlon. Hibs drew 0–0 at St Mirren in his first game in charge. A run of 1 win in 11 games meant that Hibs again finished in the bottom half of the league and were dragged into a battle to avoid a relegation play-off. A run of 13 games without a win to finish the 2013–14 Scottish Premiership season meant that Hibs fell into a relegation play-off. A 2–0 win in the first leg against Hamilton Academical gave Hibs fresh hope of avoiding relegation, but they lost 2–0 in the return game and lost the tie after a penalty shootout.

4 August 2013 Premiership	Hibernian	0 – 1	Motherwell	Easter Road, Edinburgh
		BBC Sport	Anier 83'	Attendance: 9,237; Referee: Madden

11 August 2013 Premiership	Heart of Midlothian	1 – 0	Hibernian	Tynecastle Stadium, Edinburgh
	Paterson 72'	BBC Sport		Attendance: 16,621; Referee: Thomson

17 August 2013 Premiership	Hibernian	1 – 1	Dundee United	Easter Road, Edinburgh
	Robertson 81'	BBC Sport	Armstrong 29'	Attendance: 9,171; Referee: Crawford

24 August 2013 Premiership	Kilmarnock	1 – 2	Hibernian	Rugby Park, Kilmarnock
	Nicholson 23'	BBC Sport	Craig 47', 80'	Attendance: 3,807; Referee: Clancy

31 August 2013 Premiership	Hibernian	0 – 0	Ross County	Easter Road, Edinburgh
		BBC Sport		Attendance: 9,569; Referee: Brines

14 September 2013 Premiership	St Johnstone	1 – 2	Hibernian	McDiarmid Park, Perth
	May 23'	BBC Sport	Heffernan 35'; Collins 59'	Attendance: 4,095; Referee: Madden

21 September 2013 Premiership	Hibernian	2 – 0	St Mirren	Easter Road, Edinburgh
	Collins 10'; Heffernan 61'	BBC Sport		Attendance: 9,417; Referee: McLean

28 September 2013 Premiership	Inverness CT	3 – 0	Hibernian	Caledonian Stadium, Inverness
	McKay 11', 61'; Foran 59'	BBC Sport		Attendance: 4,261; Referee: Collum

7 October 2013 Premiership	Partick Thistle	0 – 1	Hibernian	Firhill Stadium, Glasgow
		BBC Sport	Craig 69'	Attendance: 4,521; Referee: Clancy

19 October 2013 Premiership	Hibernian	1 – 1	Celtic	Easter Road, Edinburgh
	Heffernan 18'	BBC Sport	Forrest 77'	Attendance: 14,220; Referee: Murray

26 October 2013 Premiership	Hibernian	0 – 2	Aberdeen	Easter Road, Edinburgh
		BBC Sport	Vernon 80'; Wylde 93'	Attendance: 12,810; Referee: McLean

3 November 2013 Premiership	Motherwell	1 – 0	Hibernian	Fir Park, Motherwell
	McManus 23'	BBC Sport		Attendance: 3,864; Referee: Crawford

9 November 2013 Premiership	Hibernian	0 – 2	Inverness CT	Easter Road, Edinburgh
		BBC Sport	Ross 14' (pen.); McKay 18'	Attendance: 8,750; Referee: Madden

23 November 2013 Premiership	St Mirren	0 – 0	Hibernian	St Mirren Park, Paisley
		BBC Sport		Attendance: 4,451; Referee: McLean

7 December 2013 Premiership	Hibernian	1 – 1	Partick Thistle	Easter Road, Edinburgh
	Collins 90'	BBC Sport	Doolan 49'	Attendance: 10,431; Referee: Beaton

14 December 2013 Premiership	Celtic	1 – 0	Hibernian	Celtic Park, Glasgow
	Pukki 29'	BBC Sport		Attendance: 46,065; Referee: Madden

21 December 2013 Premiership	Hibernian	0 – 0	St Johnstone	Easter Road, Edinburgh
		BBC Sport		Attendance: 8,776; Referee: Muir

26 December 2013 Premiership	Ross County	0 – 2	Hibernian	Victoria Park, Dingwall
		BBC Sport	Nelson 18'; Forster 56'	Attendance: 3,383; Referee: Colvin

29 December 2013 Premiership	Hibernian	3 – 0	Kilmarnock	Easter Road, Edinburgh
	Hanlon 12'; Cairney 77'; Stevenson 90'	BBC Sport		Attendance: 9,683; Referee: Collum

2 January 2014 Premiership	Hibernian	2 – 1	Heart of Midlothian	Easter Road, Edinburgh
	Collins 61'; Craig 83' (pen.)	Report	Smith 72'	Attendance: 20,106; Referee: Madden

5 January 2014 Premiership	Dundee United	2 – 2	Hibernian	Tannadice Park, Dundee
	Goodwillie 83'; Graham 90'	BBC Sport	Craig 38', 61' (pen.)	Attendance: 7,862; Referee: McLean

10 January 2014 Premiership	Aberdeen	1 – 0	Hibernian	Pittodrie Stadium, Aberdeen
	Flood 87'	BBC Sport		Attendance: 12,734; Referee: Thomson

18 January 2014 Premiership	Hibernian	2 – 3	St Mirren	Easter Road, Edinburgh
	Collins 63', 89'	BBC Sport	Williams 5' (own goal); Campbell 24'; Thompson 26'	Attendance: 9,610; Referee: Collum

26 January 2014 Premiership	Hibernian	0 – 4	Celtic	Easter Road, Edinburgh
		BBC Sport	Commons 9', 90' (pen.) van Dijk 77'; Pukki 83'	Attendance: 12,542; Referee: Thomson

15 February 2014 Premiership	Hibernian	2 – 1	Ross County	Easter Road, Edinburgh
	Stanton 10'; Taiwo 24'	BBC Sport	Brittain 59'	Attendance: 8,411; Referee: Madden

22 February 2014 Premiership	Kilmarnock	1 – 1	Hibernian	Rugby Park, Kilmarnock
	McKenzie 20'	BBC Sport	Haynes 56'	Attendance: 4,036; Referee: Thomson

28 February 2014 Premiership	Hibernian	1 – 3	Dundee United	Easter Road, Edinburgh
	Forster 45'	BBC Sport	Ciftci 43'; Gunning 56'; El Alagui 83'	Attendance: 9,608; Referee: Norris

8 March 2014 Premiership	Hibernian	3 – 3	Motherwell	Easter Road, Edinburgh
	Forster 43'; Nelson 76'; Heffernan 79'	BBC Sport	Sutton 12', 90'; Ainsworth 29'	Attendance: 8,277; Referee: McLean

12 March 2014 Premiership	Inverness CT	0 – 0	Hibernian	Caledonian Stadium, Inverness
		BBC Sport		Attendance: 2,537; Referee: Finnie

15 March 2014 Premiership	Partick Thistle	3 – 1	Hibernian	Firhill Stadium, Glasgow
	Erskine 43'; Mair 60'; Higginbotham 90'	BBC Sport	Watmore 62'	Attendance: 4,448; Referee: Colvin

22 March 2014 Premiership	St Johnstone	2 – 0	Hibernian	McDiarmid Park, Perth
	MacLean 18'; McGivern 55' (own goal)	BBC Sport		Attendance: 3,553; Referee: McLean

30 March 2014 Premiership	Heart of Midlothian	2 – 0	Hibernian	Tynecastle Stadium, Edinburgh
	Carrick 7'; King 90+3'	BBC Sport	Maybury (yellow card) 90' (yellow-red card)	Attendance: 16,873; Referee: McLean

7 April 2014 Premiership	Hibernian	0 – 2	Aberdeen	Easter Road, Edinburgh
		BBC Sport	McGinn 14', 62'	Attendance: 9,321; Referee: Madden

19 April 2014 Premiership	St Mirren	2 – 0	Hibernian	St Mirren Park, Paisley
15:00	McLean 1'; McGowan 15'; Goodwin (red card) 30'	BBC Sport		Attendance: 5,287; Referee: Clancy

27 April 2014 Premiership	Hibernian	1 – 2	Heart of Midlothian	Easter Road, Edinburgh
	Forster 69'	BBC Sport	Paterson 37', 41'	Attendance: 14,806; Referee: Madden

3 May 2014 Premiership	Hibernian	1 – 1	Partick Thistle	Easter Road, Edinburgh
	Nelson (yellow card) 80' (yellow-red card); Stanton 88'	BBC Sport	Doolan 8'	Attendance: 10,740; Referee: Muir

6 May 2014 Premiership	Ross County	1 – 0	Hibernian	Victoria Park, Dingwall
	Brittain 63' (pen.)	BBC Sport		Attendance: 3,850; Referee: Beaton

10 May 2014 Premiership	Hibernian	0 – 1	Kilmarnock	Easter Road, Edinburgh
		BBC Sport	Boyd 44'	Attendance: 15,057; Referee: Thomson

=== Premiership play-offs ===
21 May 2014 Play-offs Final R1	Hamilton Academical	0 – 2	Hibernian	New Douglas Park, Hamilton
		BBC Report	Cummings 39', 55'	Attendance: 5,322; Referee: Madden

25 May 2014 Play-offs Final R2	Hibernian	0 – 2 (a.e.t.) (2–2 agg.) (3–4 p)	Hamilton Academical	Easter Road, Edinburgh
		BBC Report	Scotland 13'; Andreu 90+3'	Attendance: 18,031; Referee: Collum

=== Scottish League Cup ===
As a club that qualified for European competition, Hibs entered the 2013–14 Scottish League Cup in the third round. In the third round draw Hibs were given a home tie against Stranraer. Liam Craig scored a hat-trick for Hibs as they progressed to the quarter-final with a 5–3 victory. Hibs were given another home draw in the quarter-final as they were paired with Edinburgh derby rivals Hearts. Despite entering the match as favourites against a youthful Hearts side, Hibs squandered several early chances and lost 1–0. Pat Fenlon resigned two days later, although he claimed that he had already decided before the cup match to leave.

24 September 2013 Third round	Hibernian	5 – 3	Stranraer	Easter Road, Edinburgh
	Craig 8', 47', 61' (pen.); Zoubir 34'; Rumsby 36' (own goal)	BBC Sport	Longworth 3'; Aitken 48'; Nelson 52' (own goal)	Attendance: 6,431; Referee: Crawford

30 October 2013 Quarter-final	Hibernian	0 – 1	Heart of Midlothian	Easter Road, Edinburgh
		Report	Stevenson 34'	Attendance: 16,797; Referee: Willie Collum

=== Scottish Cup ===
As a Premiership club, Hibs entered the 2013–14 Scottish Cup in the fourth round and were drawn away to fellow Premiership club Ross County. Hibs progressed to the last 16 with a 1–0 victory at Victoria Park, recording their first ever win against Ross County. In the fifth round (last 16) draw, Hibs were given a home tie against Championship club Raith Rovers. Hibs were knocked out of the competition by Raith, who won 3–2 at Easter Road.

30 November 2013 Fourth round	Ross County	0 – 1	Hibernian	Victoria Park, Dingwall
		BBC Sport	Handling 31'	Attendance: 2,213; Referee: Thomson

8 February 2014 Fifth round	Hibernian	2 – 3	Raith Rovers	Easter Road, Edinburgh
	Stanton 14'; Nelson 45'	BBC Sport	Moon 6'; Hill 45'; Anderson 63'	Attendance: 10,503; Referee: McLean

=== UEFA Europa League ===
Having lost the 2013 Scottish Cup Final to league champions Celtic, Hibs qualified for the 2013–14 UEFA Europa League competition. The club entered at the second qualifying round stage, but were unseeded. Hibs were drawn against the winners of a first round tie between Malmö and Drogheda United. Malmö progressed to the second round with a 2–0 aggregate victory against Drogheda. Hibs lost the first leg 2–0 in Malmö and they were eliminated after suffering a 7–0 defeat in the home leg, losing 9–0 on aggregate. This broke the Scottish record for margin of defeat in European competition, previously held by Rangers in the 1959–60 European Cup.

18 July 2013 2QR(1)	Malmö (Sweden)	2 – 0	(Scotland) Hibernian	Swedbank Stadion, Malmö
	Hamad 11'; Eriksson 13'	BBC Sport		Attendance: 8,628; Referee: Eisner

25 July 2013 2QR(2)	Hibernian (Scotland)	0 – 7 (0 – 9 agg.)	(Sweden) Malmö	Easter Road, Edinburgh
		BBC Sport	Eriksson 21'; Forsberg 26'; Halsti 30'; Albornoz 41'; Rantie 61'; Hamad 65'; Kroon 71'	Attendance: 16,018; Referee: Delferiere

== Deaths ==
- 22 July: Lawrie Reilly, 84, Hibernian and Scotland player; member of the Famous Five forward line.
- 24 August: Gerry Baker, 75, Hibernian, Motherwell and St Mirren forward.
- 22 December: David Paul, 18, Hibernian youth player.

== Player statistics ==
During the 2013–14 season, Hibs used 28 different players in competitive games. The table below shows the number of appearances and goals scored by each player.

As of 19:43, 25 May 2014 (UTC)

No.	Pos	Nat	Player	Total		Premiership		Europa League		League Cup		Scottish Cup	
No.	Pos	Nat	Player	Apps	Goals	Apps	Goals	Apps	Goals	Apps	Goals	Apps	Goals
1	GK	(England) ENG	Ben Williams	45	0	39	0	2	0	2	0	2	0
3	DF	(Northern Ireland) NIR	Ryan McGivern	39	0	36	0	0	0	2	0	1	0
4	DF	(Scotland) SCO	Paul Hanlon	34	1	28	1	2	0	2	0	2	0
5	DF	(England) ENG	Michael Nelson	37	3	35	2	0	0	1	0	1	1
6	DF	(Northern Ireland) NIR	James McPake	7	0	3	0	2	0	2	0	0	0
7	MF	(Scotland) SCO	Alex Harris	20	0	17	0	2	0	0	0	1	0
8	MF	(Scotland) SCO	Scott Robertson	31	1	26	1	2	0	2	0	1	0
9	FW	(England) ENG	Rowan Vine	14	0	10	0	2	0	2	0	0	0
10	MF	(Scotland) SCO	Liam Craig	42	9	36	6	2	0	2	3	2	0
11	MF	(Scotland) SCO	Paul Cairney	20	1	19	1	0	0	0	0	1	0
14	FW	(Republic of Ireland) IRL	James Collins	40	6	36	6	0	0	2	0	2	0
15	MF	(England) ENG	Daniel Boateng	3	0	3	0	0	0	0	0	0	0
16	DF	(Scotland) SCO	Lewis Stevenson	43	1	37	1	2	0	2	0	2	0
17	MF	(Wales) WAL	Owain Tudur Jones	18	0	16	0	1	0	0	0	1	0
18	DF	(Republic of Ireland) IRL	Alan Maybury	18	0	16	0	0	0	1	0	1	0
19	MF	(Scotland) SCO	Danny Handling	22	1	19	0	2	0	0	0	1	1
20	MF	(England) ENG	Tom Taiwo	28	1	22	1	2	0	2	0	2	0
21	GK	(Scotland) SCO	Sean Murdoch	1	0	1	0	0	0	0	0	0	0
22	DF	(Scotland) SCO	Fraser Mullen	4	0	3	0	1	0	0	0	0	0
22	MF	(England) ENG	Duncan Watmore	10	1	9	1	0	0	0	0	1	0
23	DF	(Scotland) SCO	Jordon Forster	30	4	26	4	2	0	0	0	2	0
24	FW	(Republic of Ireland) IRL	Paul Heffernan	22	4	21	4	0	0	0	0	1	0
26	MF	(Scotland) SCO	Sam Stanton	33	3	30	2	1	0	1	0	1	1
27	MF	(France) FRA	Abdellah Zoubir	16	1	13	0	0	0	2	1	1	0
29	FW	(Scotland) SCO	Ross Caldwell	7	0	3	0	1	0	2	0	1	0
33	MF	(England) ENG	Danny Haynes	11	1	10	1	0	0	0	0	1	0
34	MF	(Scotland) SCO	Dean Horribine	1	0	1	0	0	0	0	0	0	0
35	FW	(Scotland) SCO	Jason Cummings	18	2	18	2	0	0	0	0	0	0
38	MF	(Scotland) SCO	Kevin Thomson	22	0	19	0	2	0	1	0	0	0

== Team statistics ==
=== League table ===
Pos	Team	Pld	W	D	L	GF	GA	GD	Pts	Qualification or relegation
8	St Mirren	38	10	9	19	39	58	−19	39	
9	Kilmarnock	38	11	6	21	45	66	−21	39	
10	Partick Thistle	38	8	14	16	46	65	−19	38	
11	Hibernian (R)	38	8	11	19	31	51	−20	35	Qualification for the Premiership play-off final
12	Heart of Midlothian (R)	38	10	8	20	45	65	−20	23 (Note: Heart of Midlothian were deducted 15 points for entering administration)	Relegation to the Championship

Source: SPFL Archive
Rules for classification: 1) points; 2) goal difference; 3) number of goals scored.
(R) Relegated

=== Division summary ===
Round	1	2	3	4	5	6	7	8	9	10	11	12	13	14	15	16	17	18	19	20	21	22	23	24	25	26	27	28	29	30	31	32	33	34	35	36	37	38
Ground	H	A	H	A	H	A	H	A	A	H	H	A	H	A	H	A	H	A	H	H	A	A	H	H	H	A	H	H	A	A	A	A	A	A	H	H	A	H
Result	L	L	D	W	D	W	W	L	W	D	L	L	L	D	D	L	D	W	W	W	D	L	L	L	W	D	L	D	D	L	L	L	L	L	L	D	L	L
Position	10	9	9	8	8	7	5	5	5	5	6	7	7	7	7	7	7	7	7	6	6	6	7	7	7	7	7	7	7	7	7	7	7	7	8	8	9	11

Updated to match(es) played on 25 May 2014. Source:
A = Away; H = Home; W = Win; D = Draw; L = Loss

=== Management statistics ===
Name	From	To	P	W	D	L	Win% (Note: Win% is the percentage of matches won rounded to two decimal places.)
Pat Fenlon	29 July 2013	1 November 2013	15	5	3	7	33.33
Jimmy Nicholl	1 November 2013	12 November 2013	2	0	0	2	0.00
Terry Butcher	12 November 2013	25 May 2014	29	6	8	15	20.69

== Transfers ==
In January 2013, Hibs announced the pre-contract signing of St Johnstone midfielder Liam Craig. Ryan McGivern, who had been on loan at Hibs for most of the 2012–13 season, and Inverness midfielder Owain Tudur Jones were signed towards the end of May. Hibs had hoped to retain the services of on-loan striker Leigh Griffiths, but his parent club Wolves rejected all offers for the player. Hibs instead paid £200,000 to acquire Swindon Town striker James Collins.

Early in the January 2014 window, BBC Sport reported that new manager Terry Butcher had made Rowan Vine, Tom Taiwo, Tim Clancy and Kevin Thomson available for transfer. Butcher refused to confirm the report, but said that allowing some players to leave would freshen the squad and that he was also looking to recruit some new players. On the final day of January, Hibs completed loan deals for three English players: Daniel Boateng, Danny Haynes and Duncan Watmore. Vine and Clancy had their contracts cancelled by mutual consent.

=== Players in ===
Player	From	Fee
(Scotland) Liam Craig	(Scotland) St Johnstone	Free
(Wales) Owain Tudur Jones	(Scotland) Inverness Caledonian Thistle	Free
(Northern Ireland) Ryan McGivern	(England) Manchester City	Free
(Scotland) Fraser Mullen	(Scotland) Heart of Midlothian	Free
(England) Rowan Vine	(Scotland) St Johnstone	Free
(Republic of Ireland) James Collins	(England) Swindon Town	£200,000
(England) Michael Nelson	(England) Bradford City	Nominal
(Republic of Ireland) Paul Heffernan	(Scotland) Kilmarnock	Free

=== Players out ===
Player	To	Fee
(Scotland) Scott Smith	(Scotland) Dumbarton	Free
(Republic of Ireland) Eoin Doyle	(England) Chesterfield	Free
(Republic of Ireland) Gary Deegan	(England) Northampton Town	Free
(Scotland) David Wotherspoon	(Scotland) St Johnstone	Free
(Scotland) Martin Scott	(Scotland) Livingston	Free
(Wales) Calum Antell	(Scotland) Queen of the South	Free
(Finland) Shefki Kuqi		Free
(The Gambia) Pa Saikou Kujabi		Free
(England) Lewis Horner	(England) Newcastle Benfield	Free
(Scotland) Harry Monaghan		Free
(Scotland) Fraser Mullen	(Scotland) Raith Rovers	Free
(Republic of Ireland) Tim Clancy	(Scotland) St Johnstone	Free
(England) Rowan Vine	(Scotland) Greenock Morton	Free

=== Loans in ===
Player	From
(France) Abdellah Zoubir	(France) FC Istres
(England) Daniel Boateng	(England) Arsenal
(England) Danny Haynes	(England) Notts County
(England) Duncan Watmore	(England) Sunderland

=== Loans out ===
Player	To
(Scotland) Callum Booth	(Scotland) Raith Rovers
(Scotland) Paul Grant	(Scotland) Berwick Rangers
(Scotland) Bradley Donaldson	(Scotland) Arbroath
(Scotland) David Gold	(Scotland) Queen's Park
(Scotland) David Gold	(Scotland) Cowdenbeath
(Scotland) Ross Caldwell	(Scotland) Alloa Athletic

== See also ==
- List of Hibernian F.C. seasons
