= William Atashkadeh =

Iranian-Swedish footballer (born 1992)

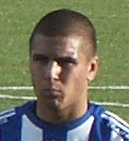

Personal information
- Full name: William Philip Siros Atashkadeh
- Date of birth: 12 April 1992 (age 34)
- Place of birth: Gothenburg, Sweden
- Height: 1.81 m (5 ft 11 1/2 in)
- Position: Striker

Youth career
- 1996–2002: Azalea BK
- 2002–2010: IFK Göteborg

Senior career*
Years	Team	Apps	(Gls)
2010–2011	IFK Göteborg	5	(1)
2011–2014	Örebro SK	37	(7)
2015–2018	Örgryte IS	71	(34)

International career^{‡}
2009–2011	Sweden U17	9	(1)
- * Club domestic league appearances and goals as of 23 May 2018 ‡ National team caps and goals as of 19 March 2013

William Atashkadeh (Persian: ویلیام آتشکده; born 12 April 1992 in Gothenburg) is an Iranian-Swedish footballer. He has been capped by the Sweden men's national under-19 football team.

== Club career ==
William Atashkadeh was born in Gothenburg and began his career with IFK Göteborg. After a successful 2012 campaign with Örebro SK in the Swedish Allsvenskan, which included scoring 6 goals in 16 appearances, Atashkadeh injured himself and returned to play only 9 games in the 2013 campaign. He joined Örgryte IS in 2015. Atashkadeh was Örgryte's leading goalscorer in the 2015 Division 1 season with 20 goals in 22 league matches.

== International career ==
Atashkadeh played for the Sweden men's national under-19 football team. On 19 March 2013, Atashkadeh was invited by Iran manager Carlos Queiroz for their 2015 Asian Cup qualifying camp and trained with them but did not make his first senior international appearance.

== Career statistics ==
As of 28 April 2018

Club	Division	Season	League		Cup		Continental		Other		Total	
Club	Division	Season	Apps	Goals	Apps	Goals	Apps	Goals	Apps	Goals	Apps	Goals
Göteborg	Allsvenskan	2009	0	0	1	0	0	0	–	–	1	0
Göteborg	Allsvenskan	2010	5	1	0	0	0	0	–	–	5	1
Göteborg	Total		5	1	1	0	0	0	0	0	6	1
Örebro	Allsvenskan	2011	12	1	1	0	0	0	–	–	13	1
Örebro	Allsvenskan	2012	16	6	0	0	–	–	–	–	16	6
Örebro	Superettan	2013	9	0	1	0	–	–	–	–	10	0
Örebro	Allsvenskan	2014	0	0	0	0	–	–	–	–	0	0
Örebro	Total		37	7	2	0	0	0	0	0	39	7
Örgryte	Division 1	2015	22	20	0	0	–	–	2	0	24	20
Örgryte	Superettan	2016	26	9	1	0	–	–	–	–	27	9
Örgryte	Superettan	2017	23	5	1	0	–	–	1	1	25	6
Örgryte	Superettan	2018	0	0	0	0	–	–	–	–	0	0
Örgryte	Total		71	34	2	0	0	0	3	1	76	35
Career total			113	42	5	0	0	0	3	1	121	43
