= 2016 Superettan =

Superettan
- Season: 2016
- Champions: IK Sirius
- Promoted: IK Sirius; AFC United; Halmstads BK
- Relegated: Assyriska FF; Ljungskile SK; Ängelholms FF
- Matches played: 240
- Goals scored: 618 (2.58 per match)
- Top goalscorer: Shkodran Maholli (15 goals)
- Biggest home win: GAIS 7–0 Ängelholms FF (22 May 2016)
- Biggest away win: Ängelholms FF 0–4 IFK Värnamo (1 May 2016)
- Highest scoring: IK Sirius 5–3 Assyriska FF (24 July 2016)
- Longest winning run: 7 matches IK Sirius
- Longest unbeaten run: 11 matches AFC United
- Longest winless run: 15 matches Ängelholms FF
- Longest losing run: 6 matches Ljungskile SK
- Highest attendance: 11,690; GAIS 0–0 Örgryte IS (30 April 2016)
- Lowest attendance: 181; AFC United 5–0 IFK Värnamo (7 August 2016)
- Total attendance: 414,399
- Average attendance: 1,727

The 2016 Superettan, part of the 2016 Swedish football season, was the 17th season of Superettan, Sweden's second-tier football league in its current format. The 2016 fixtures were released in December 2015. The season started in April 2016 and ended in November 2016.

== Teams ==
A total of 16 teams contested the league. The top two teams qualified directly for promotion to the Allsvenskan, whilst the third had to play a play-off against the fourteenth-placed team in the Allsvenskan to decide who would play in the 2017 Allsvenskan. The bottom two teams were directly relegated to Division 1, whilst the thirteenth and the fourteenth-placed teams had to play-off against the second-placed teams from Division 1 Södra and Division 1 Norra to decide who would play in the 2017 Superettan.

2015 champions Jönköpings Södra IF and runners-up Östersunds FK were promoted to the Allsvenskan at the end of the 2015 season. They were replaced by Halmstads BK and Åtvidabergs FF. Utsiktens BK and IF Brommapojkarna were relegated at the end of the 2015 season after finishing in the bottom two places of the table. They were replaced by Division 1 Norra champions Dalkurd FF and Division 1 Södra champions Trelleborgs FF. Mjällby AIF was also relegated after losing the relegation play-offs to Division 1 Södra runner-up Örgryte IS.

=== Stadia and locations ===
Locations of the 2016 Superettan teams

Team	Location	Stadium	Turf^{1}	Stadium capacity^{1}	2015 season
AFC United	Stockholm	Skytteholms IP	Natural	2,000	8th in Superettan
Assyriska FF	Södertälje	Södertälje Fotbollsarena	Artificial	6,400	4th in Superettan
Dalkurd FF	Borlänge	Domnarvsvallen	Artificial	6,500	1st in Division 1 Norra
Degerfors IF	Degerfors	Stora Valla	Natural	12,500	9th in Superettan
GAIS	Gothenburg	Gamla Ullevi	Natural	18,416	11th in Superettan
Halmstads BK	Halmstad	Örjans Vall	Natural	15,500	15th in Allsvenskan
IFK Värnamo	Värnamo	Finnvedsvallen	Natural	5,000	10th in Superettan
IK Frej	Täby	Vikingavallen	Artificial	2,750	14th in Superettan
IK Sirius	Uppsala	Studenternas IP	Natural	6,300	3rd in Superettan
Ljungskile SK	Ljungskile	Uddevalla Arena	Natural	8,000	6th in Superettan
Syrianska FC	Södertälje	Södertälje Fotbollsarena	Artificial	6,400	7th in Superettan
Trelleborgs FF	Trelleborg	Vångavallen	Natural	10,000	1st in Division 1 Södra
Varbergs BoIS	Varberg	Påskbergsvallen	Natural	4,500	5th in Superettan
Åtvidabergs FF	Åtvidaberg	Kopparvallen	Artificial	8,000	16th in Allsvenskan
Ängelholms FF	Ängelholm	Ängelholms IP	Natural	5,000	12th in Superettan
Örgryte IS	Gothenburg	Gamla Ullevi	Natural	18,416	2nd in Division 1 Södra

- ^{1} According to each club information page at the Swedish Football Association website for Superettan.

== League table ==
Pos	Team	Pld	W	D	L	GF	GA	GD	Pts	Promotion, qualification or relegation
1	IK Sirius (C, P)	30	18	7	5	54	23	+31	61	Promotion to Allsvenskan
2	AFC United (P)	30	18	7	5	50	20	+30	61	Promotion to Allsvenskan
3	Halmstads BK (O, P)	30	16	6	8	43	28	+15	54	Qualification to Promotion playoffs
4	Dalkurd FF	30	14	11	5	41	24	+17	53	
5	Varbergs BoIS	30	14	6	10	33	37	−4	48	
6	Åtvidabergs FF	30	13	5	12	53	53	0	44	
7	Trelleborgs FF	30	10	10	10	39	35	+4	40	
8	GAIS	30	9	12	9	45	36	+9	39	
9	Örgryte IS	30	11	6	13	42	44	−2	39	
10	IK Frej	30	9	11	10	38	42	−4	38	
11	IFK Värnamo	30	8	11	11	35	40	−5	35	
12	Degerfors IF	30	8	9	13	34	54	−20	33	
13	Syrianska FC (O)	30	7	11	12	26	37	−11	32	Qualification to Relegation playoffs
14	Assyriska FF (R)	30	6	10	14	36	47	−11	28	Qualification to Relegation playoffs
15	Ljungskile SK (R)	30	6	8	16	34	48	−14	26	Relegation to Division 1
16	Ängelholms FF (R)	30	4	8	18	22	57	−35	20	Relegation to Division 1

Source: svenskfotboll.se (in Swedish)
Rules for classification: 1) Points; 2) Goal difference; 3) Number of goals scored; 4) Head-to-head points; 5) Head-to-head goal difference; 6) Head-to-head away goals scored
(C) Champions; (O) Play-off winners; (P) Promoted; (R) Relegated

=== Playoffs ===
The 13th-placed and 14th-placed teams in the Superettan met the two runners-up from 2016 Division 1 (Norra and Södra) in Two-legged ties on a home-and-away basis with the teams from the Superettan finishing at home.

9 November 2016
19:00

Norrby IF	2–0	Assyriska FF
Krasnici 70'; Savolainen 79'	Report

Borås Arena, Borås
Attendance: 1,341
Referee: Patrik Eriksson (Gävle)
13 November 2016
15:00

Assyriska FF	2–2	Norrby IF
Genc 49'; Konwea 88'	Report	Yarsuvat 11', 57'

Södertälje Fotbollsarena, Södertälje
Referee: Robert Daradic (Helsingborg)

Norrby IF won 4–2 on aggregate.

13 November 2016
17:00

Vasalunds IF	0–2	Syrianska FC
	Report	Mete 25', 63'

Skytteholms IP, Solna
Attendance: 957
Referee: Johan Krantz (Uppsala)
16 November 2016
19:00

Syrianska FC	3–1	Vasalunds IF
Mete 31'; Arquin 42'; Akintioye 73'	Report	Kabran 81'

Södertälje Fotbollsarena, Södertälje
Attendance: 1,824
Referee: Magnus Lindgren (Gothenburg)

Syrianska FC won 5–1 on aggregate.

=== Positions by round ===
Team ╲ Round	1	2	3	4	5	6	7	8	9	10	11	12	13	14	15	16	17	18	19	20	21	22	23	24	25	26	27	28	29	30
IK Sirius	4	2	2	4	5	6	3	3	2	3	3	3	3	2	1	1	1	1	1	1	1	1	1	1	1	1	1	1	1	1
AFC United	1	1	1	2	2	1	1	2	3	2	2	2	2	3	2	3	3	3	3	3	3	3	3	3	3	2	2	2	2	2
Halmstads BK	12	6	3	1	1	2	2	1	1	1	1	1	1	1	3	2	2	2	2	2	2	2	2	2	2	3	3	3	3	3
Dalkurd FF	11	10	6	7	10	9	6	6	7	5	4	4	4	4	4	4	4	4	4	4	4	4	4	4	4	4	4	4	4	4
Varbergs BoIS	5	5	11	6	8	10	11	11	11	9	6	6	6	5	5	6	6	8	9	10	9	7	5	5	5	5	5	5	5	5
Åtvidabergs FF	13	16	16	11	9	5	7	7	6	4	7	7	7	7	7	7	8	5	8	8	7	8	8	8	8	8	7	6	6	6
Trelleborgs FF	10	15	12	13	13	14	15	12	9	8	9	9	9	8	8	8	7	9	5	6	5	5	6	7	6	6	8	8	8	7
GAIS	2	8	10	12	12	13	9	8	5	7	8	8	8	9	10	9	9	7	7	5	6	6	7	6	7	7	6	7	7	8
Örgryte IS	7	12	8	5	7	3	4	4	8	10	10	11	13	11	11	10	10	10	10	9	10	11	11	10	11	11	11	10	9	9
IK Frej	16	9	9	10	11	11	13	15	10	13	13	13	10	10	9	11	11	11	11	11	11	10	10	11	9	9	9	9	10	10
IFK Värnamo	9	14	7	9	4	4	5	5	4	6	5	5	5	6	6	5	5	6	6	7	8	9	9	9	10	10	10	11	12	11
Degerfors IF	15	13	15	16	16	15	12	13	14	16	14	14	12	12	13	13	14	12	12	12	12	12	12	12	13	12	12	12	11	12
Syrianska FC	14	11	14	15	14	12	14	10	12	15	16	16	15	15	16	16	16	15	14	13	13	13	13	13	12	13	13	13	13	13
Assyriska FF	3	7	13	14	15	16	16	16	16	11	11	10	11	13	14	14	12	13	13	14	14	14	14	14	14	15	15	15	14	14
Ljungskile SK	8	4	5	8	6	8	8	9	13	12	12	12	14	14	12	12	13	14	15	15	16	16	16	16	15	14	14	14	15	15
Ängelholms FF	6	3	4	3	3	7	10	14	15	14	15	15	16	16	15	15	15	16	16	16	15	15	15	15	16	16	16	16	16	16

Promotion to Allsvenskan
Promotion play-offs
Relegation play-offs
Relegation to Division 1

Source: everysport.com (in Swedish)

== Season statistics ==
=== Top scorers ===
Rank	Player	Club	Goals
1	(Sweden) Shkodran Maholli	Åtvidabergs FF	15
2	(Bosnia and Herzegovina) Dragan Kapčević	IK Sirius	14
3	(Norway) Alexander Ruud Tveter	Halmstads BK	13
4	(Germany) Mirkan Aydın	Dalkurd FF	12
4	(Sweden) Marcus Pode	Trelleborgs FF	12
6	(Sweden) Pär Cederqvist	IFK Värnamo	11
6	(Sweden) Fredrik Olsson	Halmstads BK	11

=== Top goalkeepers ===
(Minimum of 10 games played)

Rank	Goalkeeper	Club	GP	GA	SV%	CS
1	(United States) Josh Wicks	AFC United	29	16	86	16
2	(Sweden) Lukas Jonsson	IK Sirius	19	13	82	11
3	(Sweden) Fredrik Persson	Trelleborgs FF	26	27	81	11
4	(Sweden) Stojan Lukić	Halmstads BK	30	28	78	15
4	(Sweden) Benny Lekström	IK Sirius	11	10	78	3
6	(Sweden) Tommi Vaiho	GAIS	29	35	77	8
7	(Sweden) Robertino Kljajic	Örgryte IS	19	27	76	5
8	(Norway) Jonathan Rasheed	IFK Värnamo	30	40	74	10
9	(Sweden) Marko Atanackovic	IK Frej	24	36	73	4

=== Hat-tricks ===
Player	For	Against	Result	Date
(Sweden) Luka Mijaljević (South Africa) Luther Singh	GAIS	Ängelholms FF	7–0	22 May 2016
(Sierra Leone) Mohamed Buya Turay	AFC United	Syrianska FC	1–3	29 May 2016
(Germany) Mirkan Aydın	Dalkurd FF	Åtvidabergs FF	5–0	4 June 2016
(Bosnia and Herzegovina) Dragan Kapčević^{4 goals}	IK Sirius	Assyriska FF	5–3	24 July 2016
(Sweden) Salif Camara Jönsson	Trelleborgs FF	Åtvidabergs FF	5–2	15 August 2016
(Sweden) Shkodran Maholli	Åtvidabergs FF	Ängelholms FF	4–1	5 November 2016
