= 2015 Division 1 (Swedish football) =

Division 1
- Season: 2015
- Champions: Dalkurd FF (Norra); Trelleborgs FF (Södra)
- Promoted: Dalkurd FF; Trelleborgs FF; Örgryte IS
- Relegated: Huddinge IF; Södertälje FK; Motala AIF; IS Halmia; Eskilsminne IF; Lunds BK
- Top goalscorer: Salif Camara Jönsson (23 goals, Södra); Simon Mårtensson (17 goals, Norra)
- Highest attendance: 5,442; Örgryte IS 6–2 Norrby IF (5 October 2015)

The 2015 Division 1, part of the 2015 Swedish football season is the 10th season of Sweden's third-tier football league in its current format. The 2015 fixtures were released in December 2014. The season started on 12 April 2015 and will end on 1 November 2015.

== Teams ==
28 teams contest the league divided into two division, Norra and Södra. 19 returning from the 2014 season, three relegated from Superettan and six promoted from Division 2. The champion of each division will qualify directly for promotion to Superettan, the two runners-up has to play a play-off against the thirteenth and fourteenth team from Superettan to decide who will play in Superettan 2016. The bottom three teams in each division will qualify directly for relegation to Division 2. Due to three relegated teams from Superettan being geographically located in Division 1 Södra, Motala AIF was relocated from Division 1 Södra to Division 1 Norra.

=== Stadia and locations ===
==== Norra ====
Team	Location	Stadium	Stadium capacity^{1}
Akropolis IF	Stockholm	Spånga IP	300
BK Forward	Örebro	Trängens IP	4,700
Carlstad United	Karlstad	Tingvalla IP	10,000
Dalkurd FF	Borlänge	Domnarvsvallen	6,500
Huddinge IF	Huddinge	Källbrinks IP	2,500
IFK Luleå	Luleå	Skogsvallen	7,000
IK Brage	Borlänge	Domnarvsvallen	6,500
Motala AIF	Motala	Motala Idrottspark	8,500
Nyköpings BIS	Nyköping	Rosvalla IP	1,000
Piteå IF	Piteå	LF Arena	6,000
Södertälje FK	Södertälje	Södertälje IP	1,500
Umeå FC	Umeå	T3 Arena	10,000
Vasalunds IF	Stockholm	Skytteholms IP	5,000
Västerås SK	Västerås	Swedbank Park	7,000

==== Södra ====
Team	Location	Stadium	Stadium capacity^{1}
Eskilsminne IF	Helsingborg	Harlyckans IP	3,500
FC Höllviken	Höllviken	Höllvikens IP	1,900
Husqvarna FF	Huskvarna	Vapenvallen	5,000
IK Oddevold	Uddevalla	Rimnersvallen	10,600
IS Halmia	Halmstad	Örjans Vall	15,500
Kristianstads FF	Kristianstad	Kristianstads IP	6,000
Landskrona BoIS	Landskrona	Landskrona IP	12,000
Lunds BK	Lund	Klostergårdens IP	8,560
Norrby IF	Borås	Borås Arena	16,899
Oskarshamns AIK	Oskarshamn	Arena Oskarshamn	2,000
Qviding FIF	Gothenburg	Valhalla IP	4,000
Trelleborgs FF	Trelleborg	Vångavallen	10,000
Örgryte IS	Gothenburg	Gamla Ullevi	18,416
Östers IF	Växjö	Myresjöhus Arena	12,000

- ^{1} Correct as of end of 2014 season

=== Personnel and kits ===
Norra

Team	Manager	Kit manufacturer	Sponsor
Akropolis IF	(Sweden) Giannis Tsombos	Nike	Belles Golv & Städ AB
BK Forward	(Sweden) Magnus Kihlberg	Umbro	Various
Carlstad United	(Sweden) Jonas Rehnberg	Adidas	Wafab Bil
Dalkurd FF	(Sweden) Andreas Brännström	Nike	Bazar Snabbgross
Huddinge IF	(Sweden) Patrick Hultman	Adidas	None
IFK Luleå	(Sweden) Fredrik Waara	Adidas	Various
IK Brage	(Sweden) Bo Wålemark	Select Sport	SSAB
Motala AIF	(Sweden) Niklas Egnell	Adidas	Various
Nyköpings BIS	(Sweden) Lennart Andersson	Puma	Various
Piteå IF	(Sweden) Stellan Carlsson	Adidas	Various
Södertälje FK	(Sweden) Pascal Simpson	Intersport	Volkswagen
Umeå FC	(Sweden) Johan Sandahl	Adidas	Various
Vasalunds IF	(Sweden) Babar Rehman	Adidas	None
Västerås SK	(Sweden) Leif Berg	Nike	Various

Södra

Team	Manager	Kit manufacturer	Sponsor
Eskilsminne IF	(Sweden) Stefan Jansson	Adidas	Handshake For Peace
FC Höllviken	(Sweden) Anders Grimberg	Adidas	Ballingslöv
Husqvarna FF	(Sweden) Niclas Tagesson	Adidas	Husqvarna
IK Oddevold	(Sweden) Lars-Olof Mattsson	Nike	Various
IS Halmia	(Sweden) Peter Lindau	Umbro	Various
Kristianstads FF	(Sweden) Christian Carlsson	Stanno	Sportringen
Landskrona BoIS	(Sweden) Zvezdan Milošević	Stanno	Mårtenssons Bil
Lunds BK	(Sweden) Georg Eterović	Puma	Ricoh
Norrby IF	(Sweden) Tobias Edenvik	Nike	SEB
Oskarshamns AIK	(Sweden) Henrik Larsson	Hummel	Various
Qviding FIF	(Sweden) Bosko Orović	Puma	Various
Trelleborgs FF	(Sweden) Patrick Winqvist	Masita	Mellby Gård
Örgryte IS	(Sweden) Marcus Lantz	Umbro	Various
Östers IF	(Sweden) Thomas Askebrand	Puma	Various

== League tables ==
=== Norra ===
Pos	Team	Pld	W	D	L	GF	GA	GD	Pts	Promotion, qualification or relegation
1	Dalkurd FF (C, P)	26	18	7	1	52	16	+36	61	Promotion to Superettan
2	Akropolis IF (Q)	26	13	9	4	41	21	+20	48	Qualification to Promotion playoffs
3	IFK Luleå	26	12	9	5	41	29	+12	45	
4	BK Forward	26	11	9	6	47	34	+13	42	
5	Umeå FC	26	12	4	10	48	40	+8	40	
6	Nyköpings BIS	26	9	10	7	42	32	+10	37	
7	IK Brage	26	9	5	12	38	38	0	32	
8	Carlstad United BK	26	8	8	10	32	42	−10	32	
9	Piteå IF	26	8	6	12	43	44	−1	30	
10	Västerås SK	26	8	5	13	36	51	−15	29	
11	Vasalunds IF	26	8	5	13	30	46	−16	29	
12	Huddinge IF (R)	26	9	2	15	36	53	−17	29	Relegation to Division 2
13	Södertälje FK (R)	26	6	8	12	35	47	−12	26	Relegation to Division 2
14	Motala AIF (R)	26	6	3	17	31	59	−28	21	Relegation to Division 2

Source: svenskfotboll.se (in Swedish)
Rules for classification: 1) Points; 2) Goal difference; 3) Number of goals scored; 4) Head-to-head points; 5) Head-to-head goal difference; 6) Head-to-head away goals scored
(C) Champions; (P) Promoted; (Q) Qualified for the phase indicated; (R) Relegated

=== Södra ===
Pos	Team	Pld	W	D	L	GF	GA	GD	Pts	Promotion, qualification or relegation
1	Trelleborgs FF (C, P)	26	20	4	2	65	25	+40	64	Promotion to Superettan
2	Örgryte IS (O, P)	26	18	3	5	70	26	+44	57	Qualification to Promotion playoffs
3	Östers IF	26	15	5	6	39	19	+20	50	
4	IK Oddevold	26	11	7	8	46	35	+11	40	
5	Kristianstads FF	26	11	5	10	38	51	−13	38	
6	Landskrona BoIS	26	11	4	11	37	32	+5	37	
7	FC Höllviken	26	9	8	9	38	33	+5	35	
8	Oskarshamns AIK	26	10	5	11	41	42	−1	35	
9	Qviding FIF	26	7	8	11	30	41	−11	29	
10	Norrby IF	26	8	5	13	45	57	−12	29	
11	Husqvarna FF	26	8	5	13	36	51	−15	29	
12	IS Halmia (R)	26	7	4	15	41	54	−13	25	Relegation to Division 2
13	Eskilsminne IF (R)	26	5	10	11	35	51	−16	25	Relegation to Division 2
14	Lunds BK (R)	26	4	3	19	21	65	−44	15	Relegation to Division 2

Source: svenskfotboll.se (in Swedish)
Rules for classification: 1) Points; 2) Goal difference; 3) Number of goals scored; 4) Head-to-head points; 5) Head-to-head goal difference; 6) Head-to-head away goals scored
(C) Champions; (O) Play-off winners; (P) Promoted; (R) Relegated

== Season statistics ==
=== Norra top scorers ===
Rank	Player	Club	Goals
1	(Sweden) Simon Mårtensson	Umeå FC	17
2	(Sweden) Sasa Matić	Huddinge IF	14
2	(Greece) Ioannis Sotiroglou	Akropolis IF	14
4	(Palestine) Ahmed Awad	Dalkurd FF	11
4	(Ghana) Tetteh Komey	Piteå IF	11
4	(Sweden) Fredrik Notice	Södertälje FK	11
4	(Democratic Republic of the Congo) Heradi Rashidi	Södertälje FK	11
8	(Sweden) Mattias Mete	Dalkurd FF	10
8	(Sweden) Erik Törnros	Dalkurd FF	10

=== Södra top scorers ===
Rank	Player	Club	Goals
1	(Sweden) Salif Camara Jönsson	Trelleborgs FF	23
2	(Sweden) William Atashkadeh	Örgryte IS	20
3	(Sweden) Andréas Grahm	Kristianstads FF	19
4	(Sweden) Sebastian Ohlsson	Örgryte IS	16
5	(Sweden) Kristian Haynes	Trelleborgs FF	14
6	(Sweden) Zoran Jovanović	Trelleborgs FF	13
6	(Sweden) Andreas Tegström	Husqvarna FF	13
6	(Sweden) Emil Åberg	Eskilsminne IF	13
9	(Sweden) Richard Yarsuvat	Norrby IF	12
