= Jeremy Lopez =

Gibraltarian footballer (born 1989)

Personal information
- Full name: Jeremy Joseph Lopez
- Date of birth: 9 July 1989 (age 37)
- Place of birth: Gibraltar
- Positions: Winger; forward

Team information
- Current team: Manchester 62
- Number: 16

Youth career
- Europa Pegasus

Senior career*
Years	Team	Apps	(Gls)
2006–2013	Manchester United (Gibraltar) (Note: Pre-UEFA. Gibraltar football stats before 2013 are unknown)	–	(–)
2013–2016	Manchester 62	45	(9)
2016–2017	Lions Gibraltar	12	(1)
2017–2018	Lynx	19	(0)
2018–2019	Gibraltar Phoenix	18	(0)
2019–2020	Europa Point	15	(4)
2020–2023	Bruno's Magpies	27	(1)
2023–2024	Europa	4	(0)
2024–	Manchester 62	3	(0)

International career^{‡}
2009–2013	Gibraltar XI (Non-FIFA)	4	(3)
2013–2017	Gibraltar	8	(0)
- * Club domestic league appearances and goals as of 4 December 2024 ‡ National team caps and goals as of 10 October 2017

Jeremy Joseph Lopez (born 9 July 1989) is a Gibraltarian footballer who plays for Gibraltar Football League side Manchester 62 and the Gibraltar national team, where he plays as a right winger.

== International career ==
Lopez made his international debut with Gibraltar on 19 November 2013 in a 0-0 home draw with Slovakia. This was Gibraltar's first game since being admitted to UEFA

=== International career statistics ===
As of match played 10 October 2017.

Gibraltar national team
Year	Apps	Goals
2013	1	0
2014	2	0
2015	2	0
2016	1	0
2017	2	0
Total	8	0

=== International goals ===
Scores and results list Gibraltar's goal tally first.

No	Date	Venue	Opponent	Score	Result	Competition
1.	29 June 2009	Solvallen, Eckerö, Åland	Frøya	6–0	8–0	2009 Island Games
2.	29 June 2009	Solvallen, Eckerö, Åland	Frøya	7–0	8–0	2009 Island Games
3.	30 June 2011	Peter Henry Ground, Brading, Isle of Wight	Saaremaa	4–0	4–0	2011 Island Games
