= Mattias Mete =

Swedish footballer (born 1987)

Personal information
- Full name: Mattias Mete
- Date of birth: 30 May 1987 (age 39)
- Place of birth: Sweden
- Height: 1.85 m (6 ft 1 in)
- Position: Forward

Team information
- Current team: Södertälje FK

Youth career
- Syrianska FC

Senior career*
Years	Team	Apps	(Gls)
2003–2010	Syrianska FC	8	(1)
2008–2009	→ Syrianska IF Kerburan (loan)	20	(13)
2009	→ Arameiska-Syrianska KIF (loan)	8	(2)
2010	Syrianska IF Kerburan	23	(16)
2011	Västerås SK	27	(12)
2012–2013	Åtvidabergs FF	26	(4)
2013	→ Syrianska FC (loan)	13	(3)
2013–2014	Şanlıurfaspor	2	(0)
2014	Husqvarna FF	12	(3)
2015	Dalkurd FF	22	(10)
2016	Dardanel Spor	15	(7)
2016–2018	Syrianska FC	51	(20)
2019	Södertälje FK	13	(4)

International career
2003–2004	Sweden U17	13	(4)
2005–2006	Sweden U19	5	(1)

Managerial career
- 2021: Syrianska FC
- 2022–: Nykvarns SK
- * Club domestic league appearances and goals as of 30 November 2017

Mattias Mete (born 30 May 1987) is a Swedish footballer who plays for Södertälje FK as a forward.
