= Christophe Lallet =

Swedish footballer

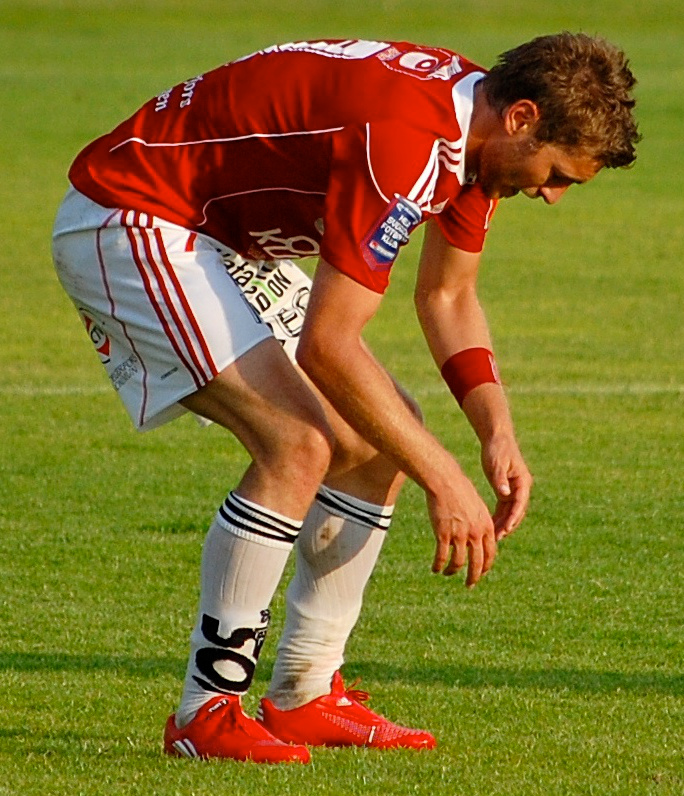

Personal information
- Date of birth: 25 July 1986 (age 40)
- Place of birth: Stockholm, Sweden
- Height: 1.81 m (5 ft 11 in)
- Position: Midfielder

Team information
- Current team: FC Gute (manager)

Youth career
- –2005: IF Brommapojkarna
- 2006: Saint-Étienne

Senior career*
| Years | Team | Apps | (Gls) |
| 2006–2007 | Väsby United | 5 | (0) |
| 2008–2011 | Degerfors IF | 84 | (18) |
| 2012–2013 | Hammarby IF | 54 | (12) |
| 2014 | Tampa Bay Rowdies | 4 | (0) |
| 2014–2015 | IK Frej | 39 | (1) |
| 2016–2018 | Långholmen FC | 12 | (5) |

Managerial career
- 2022–: FC Gute
- * Club domestic league appearances and goals

Christophe Lallet (born 25 July 1986) is a professional Swedish football player who played as a midfielder.

== Career ==
Lallet began his professional career with Väsby United in 2006, before continuing in Sweden with Degerfors IF and Hammarby IF.

Lallet signed for NASL club Tampa Bay Rowdies in January 2014. The Rowdies and Lallet mutually agreed to terminate his contract early in July 2014. In August, Lallet signed for Ik Frej to then end his footballing career in 2016, to pursue his music passion. He released eight songs from 2015 to 2019. In 2021, Lallet started to coach FC Gute

Ahead of the 2022 season, he was announced as head coach of FC Gute.
