= IFK Aspudden-Tellus =

Swedish football club

- Full name: Idrottsföreningen Kamraterna Aspudden-Tellus
- Founded: 1968
- Ground: Aspuddens IP; Stockholm; Sweden
- League: Division 3 Södra Svealand

Idrottsföreningen Kamraterna Aspudden-Tellus, more commonly known as IFK Aspudden-Tellus, is a Swedish football club based in Stockholm.

== Background ==
IFK Aspudden-Tellus currently plays in Division 2 Södra Svealand which is the fourth tier of Swedish football. They play their home matches at Aspuddens IP in Stockholm.

IFK Aspudden was formed in 1968 when Aspuddens SK merged with Årsta SK. In 2012, it merged with the football section of IK Tellus from the nearby district of Midsommarkransen, changing its name to IFK Aspudden-Tellus.

The club is affiliated to Stockholms Fotbollförbund.

== Former players ==
The club was the first team of Viktor Gyökeres, when he was a child.
