= Dragan Kapčević =

Bosnian-Herzegovinian footballer (born 1985)

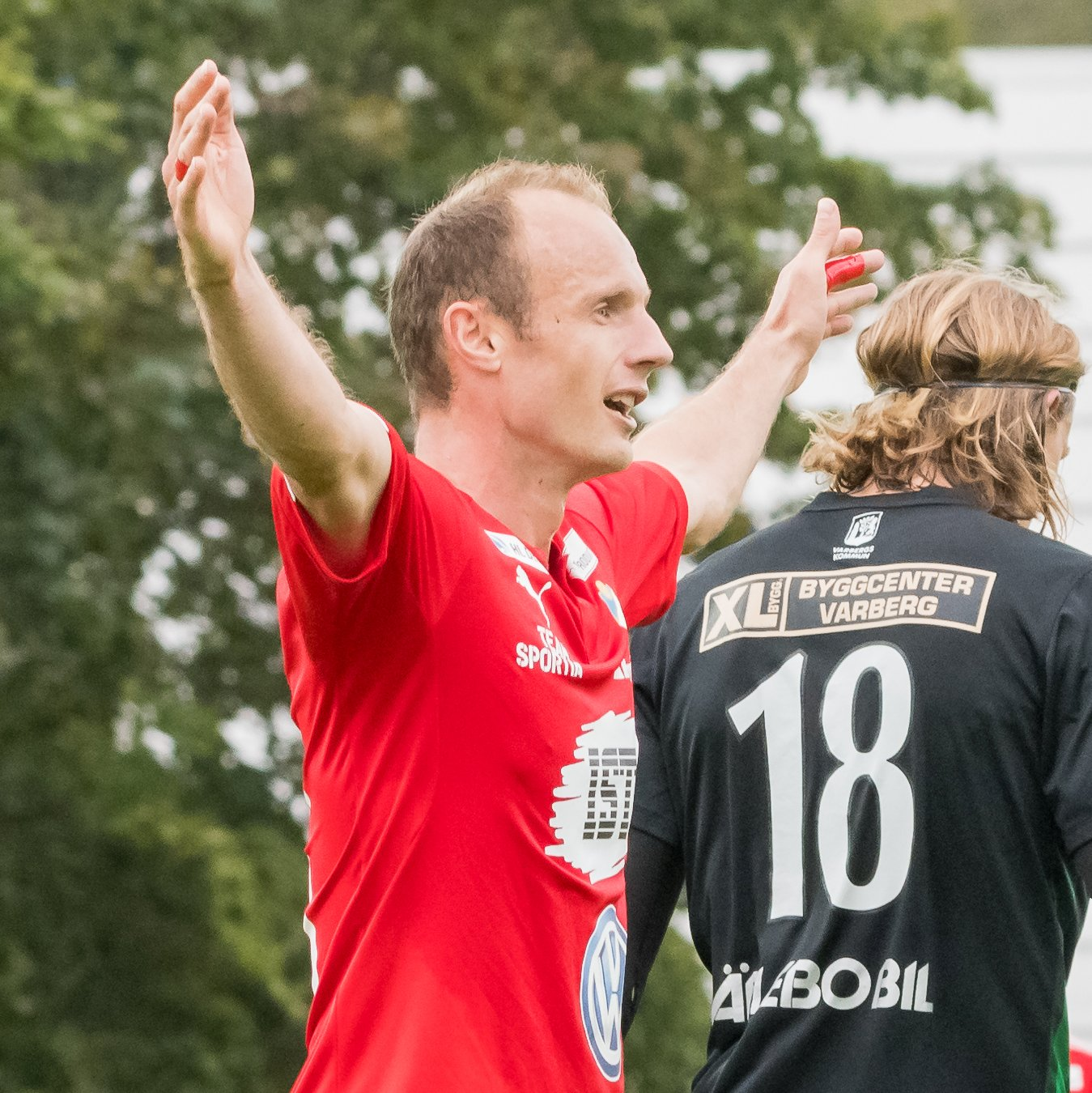

Personal information
- Full name: Dragan Kapčević
- Date of birth: 10 November 1985 (age 40)
- Place of birth: Prozor-Rama, SR Bosnia and Herzegovina, SFR Yugoslavia
- Height: 1.88 m (6 ft 2 in)
- Position: Forward

Team information
- Current team: Räppe GOIF

Youth career
- HNK Rama

Senior career*
Years	Team	Apps	(Gls)
- Zrinjski
2006–2008	Anundsjö		
2007	→ Sollefteå (loan)		
2009–2010	Sollefteå	24	(13)
2010–2012	Gefle	33	(6)
2012–2014	Brage	55	(17)
2014–2015	Husqvarna	26	(5)
2015	Östersunds	24	(10)
2016–2017	IK Sirius	33	(14)
2017–2019	Öster	54	(19)
2020-	Räppe GOIF	11	(2)
- * Club domestic league appearances and goals as of 30 November 2017

Dragan Kapčević (born 10 November 1985) is a Bosnian-Herzegovinian footballer who plays for Räppe GOIF as a forward.

== Club career ==
He first came to Sweden in 2006 when he and his brother joined third-tier club Anundsjö IF. After the club was relegated, he went on loan to Sollefteå GIF. During his time there he got into a car accident where the vehicle flipped over and he got stuck underneath. The prognosis was that his footballing career might be over. However, the next year he made a short, one-game comeback for his old club Anundsjö, where he scored two goals. And then the following year, he made a full return to playing with Sollefteå. There he performed well enough to get noticed by Allsvenskan club Gefle IF, who signed him to a 1.5-year contract.

He later played for Östers Växjö.
