= Vikingavallen =

Sports ground in Täby kyrkby, Sweden

Coordinates: 59.49187°N 18.07337°E

- Interactive map of Vikingavallen
- Location: Täby kyrkby, Sweden
- Capacity: 2,650

Construction
- Renovated: 2008

Tenant
- IK Frej

Vikingavallen is a football stadium in Täby kyrkby, Sweden and the home stadium for the football team IK Frej. Vikingavallen has a total capacity of 2,650 spectators.
