= Akropolis IF =

Swedish association football club

- Full name: Akropolis Idrottsförening
- Founded: 1968
- Dissolved: 2024
- Ground: Grimsta IP; Spånga, Stockholm
- Website: www.akropolisif.com
| Home colours | Away colours | Third colours |

Akropolis IF was a Swedish football club formed by Greek immigrants in 1968 in Spånga.

The club was named after the Acropolis of Athens, and the Parthenon is depicted on its badge.

The club went bankrupt and was dissolved in 2024.

== Background ==
Akropolis IF was a sports club which was founded in Stockholm in the spring of 1968. Basketball started in the autumn 1968 followed by football in the spring of 1969. Youth activities commenced in 1975.

The club formerly had close affiliations, since terminated, with other Stockholm football clubs such as AIK and BP .

In 1987, Akropolis advanced for the first time to Division 3. In 2006, the club made it to the second division, where they have stayed since. In 2012, Akropolis was relegated to Division 2, where they stayed until 2013 when they were once again promoted. In 2014, Akropolis was promoted from Division 2 to Division 1 again. As newcomers in Division 1, Akropolis secured qualifiers to Superettan in their second last game against IFK Luleå.

== Season to season ==
| Season | Level | Division | Section | Position | Movements |
|---|---|---|---|---|---|
| 1993 | Tier 5 | Division 4 | Stockholm Norra | 9th | |
| 1994 | Tier 5 | Division 4 | Stockholm Norra | 9th | |
| 1995 | Tier 5 | Division 4 | Stockholm Norra | 3rd | |
| 1996 | Tier 5 | Division 4 | Stockholm Norra | 5th | |
| 1997 | Tier 5 | Division 4 | Stockholm Norra | 5th | |
| 1998 | Tier 5 | Division 4 | Stockholm Norra | 3rd | |
| 1999 | Tier 5 | Division 4 | Stockholm Norra | 1st | Promoted |
| 2000 | Tier 4 | Division 3 | Norra Svealand | 9th | Relegation Playoff – Relegated |
| 2001 | Tier 5 | Division 4 | Stockholm Norra | 3rd | |
| 2002 | Tier 5 | Division 4 | Stockholm Norra | 5th | |
| 2003 | Tier 5 | Division 4 | Stockholm Norra | 5th | |
| 2004 | Tier 5 | Division 4 | Stockholm Norra | 1st | Promoted |
| 2005 | Tier 4 | Division 3 | Norra Svealand | 9th | |
| 2006* | Tier 5 | Division 3 | Norra Svealand | 2nd | Promotion Playoff – Promoted |
| 2007 | Tier 4 | Division 2 | Södra Svealand | 5th | |
| 2008 | Tier 4 | Division 2 | Södra Svealand | 5th | |
| 2009 | Tier 4 | Division 2 | Södra Svealand | 3rd | |
| 2010 | Tier 4 | Division 2 | Södra Svealand | 1st | Promoted |
| 2011 | Tier 3 | Division 1 | Norra | 11th | |
| 2012 | Tier 3 | Division 1 | Norra | 13th | Relegated |
| 2013 | Tier 4 | Division 2 | Norra Svealand | 3rd | |
| 2014 | Tier 4 | Division 2 | Norra Svealand | 1st | Promoted |
| 2015 | Tier 3 | Division 1 | Norra | 2nd | Qualifiers |
| 2016 | Tier 3 | Division 1 | Norra | 3rd | |
| 2017 | Tier 3 | Division 1 | Norra | 2nd | Qualifiers |
| 2018 | Tier 3 | Division 1 | Norra | 4th | |
| 2019 | Tier 3 | Division 1 | Norra | 1st | Promoted |
| 2020 | Tier 2 | Superettan | | 5th | |
| 2021 | Tier 2 | Superettan | | 13th | Relegation Playoff – Relegated |
| 2022 | Tier 4 | Division 2 | Norra Svealand | | |

* League restructuring in 2006 resulted in a new division being created at Tier 3 and subsequent divisions dropping a level.

== Attendances ==
Akropolis IF have had the following average attendances:

| Season | Average attendance | Division / Section | Level |
|---|---|---|---|
| 2005 | 108 | Div 3 Norra Svealand | Tier 4 |
| 2006 | 117 | Div 3 Norra Svealand | Tier 5 |
| 2007 | 213 | Div 2 Södra Svealand | Tier 4 |
| 2008 | 277 | Div 2 Södra Svealand | Tier 4 |
| 2009 | 355 | Div 2 Södra Svealand | Tier 4 |
| 2010 | 277 | Div 2 Södra Svealand | Tier 4 |
| 2011 | 373 | Div 1 Norra | Tier 3 |

* Attendances are provided in the Publikliga sections of the Svenska Fotbollförbundet website.
