= Södertälje FK =

Swedish football club

- Full name: Södertälje Fotbollsklubb
- Founded: 2012
- Ground: Östertälje IP, Södertälje
- Head coach: Michel Røøson and Utuh Røø
- League: Division 5 Södermanland 2022
- 2019: Division 2 Södra Svealand, 14th (Relegated)
Home colours

Södertälje Fotbollsklubb is a Swedish football team from Södertälje, Stockholm County. They play their matches at Södertälje Fotbollsarena.

Södertälje FK was founded in 2012 from the clubs Brunnsängs IK, Östertälje IK and FF Södertälje. Later, also Betnahrin IK and Syrianska BoIS, joined with Södertälje FK, and Södertälje took Betnahrin's place in Division 2.
