= 2017–18 Svenska Cupen =

Tournament details
- Country: Sweden
- Dates: 7 June 2017 – 10 May 2018
- Teams: 96 (competition proper)

Final positions
- Champions: Djurgårdens IF (5th title)
- Runners-up: Malmö FF

Tournament statistics
- Top goal scorer: Edin Hamidović (7 goals)

The 2017–18 Svenska Cupen was the 62nd season of the Svenska Cupen and the sixth season with the current format. The winners of the competition earned a place in the second qualifying round of the 2018–19 UEFA Europa League, unless they had already qualified for European competition in the 2018–19 season, in which case the qualification spot went to fourth-placed team of the 2017 Allsvenskan. A total of 96 clubs entered the competition.

The first two rounds were played between 7 June and 10 October 2017 respectively. The first round draw was announced on 20 March 2017, and the draw for the second round was announced on 3 August 2017. The group stage was played on the last two weekends in February 2018, and the last group stage round was played on 3 and 4 March 2018. The following quarter-finals and semi-finals were played on the weekends of 10 March and 17 March 2018 respectively, before the tournament ended with the final on 10 May 2018. Times up to 28 October 2017 and from 25 March 2018 are CEST (UTC+2). Times from 29 October 2017 to 24 March 2018 are CET (UTC+1).

Djurgårdens IF won their fifth Svenska Cupen title on 10 May 2018 after defeating Malmö FF 3–0.

== Round and draw dates ==
The schedule of the competition is as follows.

Phase	Round	Draw date and time	Match date
Initial rounds	Round 1	20 March 2017	7 June – 2 August 2017
Initial rounds	Round 2	3 August 2017	16 August – 10 October 2017
Group stage	Matchday 1	20 November 2017	9–19 February 2018
Group stage	Matchday 2	20 November 2017	24 – 26 February 2018
Group stage	Matchday 3	20 November 2017	3 – 4 March 2018
Knockout stage	Quarter-finals	4 March 2018	10 – 13 March 2018
Knockout stage	Semi-finals	4 March 2018	17 – 18 March 2018
Knockout stage	Final	21 March 2018	10 May 2018

== Teams ==
Round	Clubs remaining	Clubs involved	Winners from previous round	New entries this round	Leagues entering at this round
Qualifying Rounds	112	18	none	18	Division 1 (3 teams); Division 2 (4 teams); Division 3 (2 teams); Division 4 (8 teams); Division 5 (1 team)
Round 1	96	64	2	62	Division 1 (17 teams); Division 2 (25 teams); Division 3 (10 teams); Division 4 (10 teams)
Round 2	64	64	32	32	Allsvenskan; Superettan
Group stage	32	32	32	none	none
Quarter-finals	8	8	8	none	none
Semi-finals	4	4	4	none	none
Final	2	2	2	none	none

== Round 1 ==
64 teams from the third tier or lower of the Swedish league system competed in this round. The matches were played on 2 August 2017 at the latest.

7 June 2017	Landvetter IS (5)	1–1 (a.e.t.) (6–5 p)	Assyriska BK (3)	Landvetter
13:00	Forsman 79'	Report	Selim 51'	Stadium: Landvetter IP; Attendance: 350; Referee: Fredrik Oppong

7 June 2017	Vasalunds IF (3)	4–3	Västerås SK (3)	Solna, Stockholm
19:00	Pavey 8', 18', 58'; Own goal 67'	Report	Johansson 42'; D. Kosik Sulaiman 59'; A. Kosik Sulaiman 87'	Stadium: Skytteholms IP; Attendance: 206; Referee: Viktor Dovresjö

7 June 2017	Vänersborgs IF (4)	0–2	IK Oddevold (3)	Vänersborg
19:00		Report	Edvardsen 1'; Niklasson 71'	Stadium: Vänersvallen Nord; Attendance: 255; Referee: Kastriot Gerxhaliu

7 June 2017	Tullinge TP FK (6)	4–3	IFK Haninge (4)	Tullinge
20:00	Bahrami 38'; Akbas 57'; Bjurholm 68'; Dalawe 83'	Report	Ceric 2'; Eminovic 71', 80'	Stadium: Brantbrinks IP; Attendance: 312; Referee: Augin Melki

13 June 2017	Eskilsminne IF (4)	0–2	Landskrona BoIS (3)	Helsingborg
19:00		Report	Zahui 7'; Tkacz 58'	Stadium: Harlyckans IP; Attendance: 651; Referee: Bobby Sjögren

14 June 2017	Boo FK (4)	1–2	Arameiska-Syrianska IF (3)	Nacka, Stockholm
19:00	Sanneh 1'	Report	Borsali 36'; Awrohum 55'	Stadium: Boovallen; Attendance: 120; Referee: Mohammad Dabestani

14 June 2017	Torslanda IK (4)	1–4	Utsiktens BK (3)	Torslanda
19:00	Salihu 58'	Report	Mogren 22'; Book 56'; Angelin 67'; Lipovac 72'	Stadium: Torslandavallen 1 Grass; Attendance: 180; Referee: Denis Oppong

14 June 2017	FC Arlanda (6)	1–3	Gamla Upsala SK (4)	Märsta
19:30	Aslan 48'	Report	Lundin 13'; Watson 19'; Yaldir 28'	Stadium: Midgårdsvallen Konstgräs; Attendance: 285; Referee: Odai Alwani

14 June 2017	BKV Norrtälje (4)	0–5	Sollentuna FK (3)	Norrtälje
19:30		Report	Sonko 43', 47'; Johansson 56'; Gustafsson 75', 78'	Stadium: Norrtälje Sportcentrum; Attendance: 217; Referee: Ejub Mehic

26 June 2017	Borås AIK (6)	1–7	Husqvarna FF (3)	Borås
19:00	Nishada 85'	Report	Al-Ammari 12'; Gwargis 30', 32'; S. Dimitrijevic 40'; Mawana 43'; A. Dimitrijevic 60'; Hamidovic 64'	Stadium: Bodavallen; Attendance: 80; Referee: Christer Hallén

22 July 2017	Ytterhogdals IK (5)	1–4	Härnösands FF (4)	Ytterhogdal
15:00	Sama N´Gamb 5'	Report	Wiking 12'; Toure 13', 15'; Koidan 91'	Stadium: Svedjevallen; Attendance: 125; Referee: Robert Ahlman

23 July 2017	Torstorps IF (5)	3–1	Assyriska Turabdin IK (4)	Finspång
17:00	Skatka 49'; Pynnönen 59'; Halili 69'	Report	Strandsäter 83'	Stadium: Atlaslunden; Attendance: 212; Referee: Paul Shamoun

25 July 2017	IFK Hässleholm (4)	1–5	Hittarps IK (4)	Skåne County, Hässleholm
19:00	D. Gunnarsson 67'	Report	A. Berisha 10', 29'; A. Kopfinger 12', 38'; E. Rosqvist 78'	Stadium: Österås IP; Attendance: 78; Referee: Fredrik Rönning

25 July 2017	Kvibille BK (6)	4–1	Skrea IF (6)	Kvibille
19:00	R. Larsson 12', 69'; D. Gunnarsson 77', 90'	Report	Z. Hansson 46'	Stadium: Björkevi; Referee: Alexander Eriksson

25 July 2017	Sävedalens IF (4)	1–2	Tvååkers IF (4)	Sävedalen
19:00	S. Aganspahic 78'	Report	A. Winbo 57'; J. Barucic 93'	Stadium: Vallhamra; Attendance: Marcus Lundgren

25 July 2017	Södertälje FK (4)	0–2	Assyriska IF (4)	Södertälje
19:30		Report	K. Moilo 22'; R. Lönn 25'	Stadium: Östertälje IP; Referee: Richard Holöien

26 July 2017	Bollnäs GIF FF (4)	4–2	IFK Timrå (4)	Bollnäs
19:00	D. Ölander 28'; J. Sköld 33'; V. Roos 105'; C. Brolin 122'	Report	Own Goal 17'; O. Widahl 83'	Stadium: Sävstaås IP; Attendance: 204; Referee: Patrik Larsson

29 July 2017	Dalhem IF (6)	0–1	IFK Aspudden-Tellus (4)	Dalhem
17:00		Report	F. Crona 37'	Stadium: Dalhem IP; Attendance: 220; Referee: Vedad Kestendzic

2 August 2017	Sandvikens IF (3)	0–1	IK Brage (3)	Sandviken
18:00		Report	S. Ilic 9'	Stadium: Jernvallen; Attendance: 2,026; Referee: Mohamed Nablsi

2 August 2017	Kalmar AIK FK (5)	0–2	Nybro IF (4)	Kalmar
18:00		Report	F. Berg 45', 72'	Stadium: Fredriksskans; Attendance: 67; Referee: Yousef Issa

2 August 2017	IFK Karlshamn (5)	0–6	Kristianstad FC (3)	Karlshamn
18:00		Report	E. Åberg 7', 58'; N. Girmai Netabay 29'; A. Grahm 31', 90'; B. Mark Antonsson 54'	Stadium: Vägga IP; Attendance: 125; Referee: Jakob Magnetorp

2 August 2017	Karlbergs BK (4)	0–4	Akropolis IF (3)	Stockholm
19:00		Report	A. Rajamohan 26'; K. Stavrothanasopoulos 58'; K. Gezos 71'; M. Haglind Sangré 74'	Stadium: Stadshagens IP; Referee: Nino Baresso

2 August 2017	Huddinge IF (4)	1–4	Enskede IK (3)	Huddinge
19:00	J. Andres Almendra Cifuentes 70'	Report	F. Sanneh 22', 29', 40'; P Micic 54'	Stadium: Källbrinks IP; Attendance: 101; Referee: Tom Ghorbani

2 August 2017	IK Sleipner (4)	3–3 (a.e.t.) (1–4 p)	Värmbols FC (4)	Norrköping
19:00	M. Kemppainen 8'; D. Andersson 83'; J. Roxström 120'	Report	V. Benca 9'; J. Juhlin 15'; E. Lindgren 117'	Stadium: Östgötaporten; Attendance: 105; Referee: Håkan Söderman

2 August 2017	Örebro Syrianska IF (4)	2–2 (a.e.t.) (4–5 p)	Karlstad BK (4)	Örebro
19:00	M. Abdulrahman Mohammad 8'; B. Gorgis 63'	Report	V. Nikola 37'; A. Beqiri 49'	Stadium: Örnsro IP; Referee: Arian Chalak

2 August 2017	Melleruds IF (6)	0–6	Carlstad United BK (3)	Mellerud
19:00		Report	U. Ike 30', 65'; S. Carlsson 44', 85'; C. Nyman 79'; L. Haidar 81'	Stadium: Rådavallen; Attendance: 175; Referee: Andreas Ekholm

2 August 2017	Vimmerby IF (4)	0–4	Oskarshamns AIK (3)	Vimmerby
19:00		Report	P. Eliassi 13', 82'; C. Christensson 62'; M. Karlsson 68'	Stadium: Skobes Arena; Referee: Almir Kadiric

2 August 2017	BK Olympic (5)	2–3	Lunds BK (4)	Lindängens
19:00	G. Steven 90', 96'	Report	D. Sax 39'; K. Mjörnman 109', 118'	Stadium: Lindängens IP; Referee: Daniel Books

2 August 2017	IFK Falköping FF (5)	2–4	FC Trollhättan (4)	Kinnarp
19:00	F. Rushiti 26'; F. Menxhiqi 66'	Report	R. Jansson 17'; F. Sundström 1', 80'; J. Emanuelsson 92'	Stadium: Kinnemo; Attendance: 125; Referee: Daniel Särén

2 August 2017	Skara FC (6)	0–9	Skövde AIK (3)	Lidköping
19:00		Report	R. Örqvist 36', 55', 62'; B. Yonakhir 51'; I. Alushaj 52'; B. Jobe 59'; I. Alushaj 66'; R. Masch 74', 87'	Stadium: Sparbanken Arena; Referee: Albert Mustafa

2 August 2017	Torns IF (4)	1–0	FC Rosengård 1917 (3)	Stångby, Lund
19:00	O. Ahlgren 65'	Report		Stadium: Tornvallen; Referee: Niklas Andersson

2 August 2017	Morön BK (4)	0–1	Piteå IF FF (4)	Skellefteå
19:30		Report	S. Naiwo 79'	Stadium: Skogsvallen IP; Attendance: 278; Referee: Simon Svensson

== Round 2 ==
64 teams from all levels the Swedish league system competed in this round. The 32 match winners from Round 1 were joined by the 16 teams of the 2017 Superettan and the 16 teams of the top-flight 2017 Allsvenskan. The draw was held on August 3, 2017 and the matches were played on August 23 and 24, 2017.

16 August 2017	Akropolis IF (3)	1–3	Hammarby IF (1)	Stockholm
18:30	Sosseh 6'	Report	Bengtsson 30'; Tanković 44'; Svendsen 90+2'	Stadium: Grimsta IP; Attendance: 3,000; Referee: Patrik Eriksson

23 August 2017	Kristianstad FC (3)	1–3	Halmstads BK (1)	Kristianstad
17:30	Jawneh 53'	Report	Gunnlaugsson 19', 36'; Alho 64'	Stadium: Kristianstads IP; Attendance: 645; Referee: Robert Daradic

23 August 2017	Värmbols FC (4)	0–1	AIK (1)	Katrineholm
18:00		Report	Stefanelli 53' (pen.)	Stadium: Värmbols IP; Attendance: 3,123; Referee: Johan Krantz

23 August 2017	Torstorps IF (5)	0–3	GIF Sundsvall (1)	Finspång
18:00		Report	Bahtijar 47'; Gracia 51'; Sigurðsson 78'	Stadium: Atlaslunden; Attendance: 932; Referee: Kastriot Gerxhaliu

23 August 2017	Kvibille BK (6)	1–9	BK Häcken (1)	Kvibille
18:00	Gunnarsson 33'	Report	Ranégie 3' (pen.), 69'; A. Andersson 4', 82'; Egbuchulam 16', 51', 72'; Lindgren 73'; Hedlund 80'	Stadium: Björkevi; Attendance: 1,095; Referee: Kristoffer Karlsson

23 August 2017	Tvååkers IF (4)	2–1	Örgryte IS FF (2)	Tvååker
18:00	Syla 45'; Winbo 55'	Report	Elmander 25'	Stadium: Övrevi; Attendance: 752; Referee: Fredrik Oppong

23 August 2017	Torns IF (4)	1–3 (a.e.t.)	IFK Värnamo (2)	Stångby
18:00	Johansson 90' (pen.)	Report	Marcelo 80', 108'; Citaku 120'	Stadium: Tornvallen; Referee: Adi Aganovic

23 August 2017	IK Brage (3)	1–4	Åtvidabergs FF (2)	Borlänge
18:30	Hjertstrand 90'	Report	Öhrn 26'; Bellander 49'; Helg 60' (pen.); Lidberg 78'	Stadium: Domnarvsvallen; Attendance: 358; Referee: Enzo Vesprini

23 August 2017	Tullinge TP FK (6)	2–5	IK Frej Täby (2)	Botkyrka
18:30	Varga 15'; Talonen 78' (pen.)	Report	Sunesson 19', 22'; Ćatović 33', 76'; Kuzmanović 80'	Stadium: Brantbrinks IP; Attendance: 1,306; Referee: Viktor Dovresjö

23 August 2017	Vasalunds IF (3)	3–1 (a.e.t.)	AFC Eskilstuna (1)	Solna
18:30	Björk 66', 112'; Björnström 97' (pen.)	Report	Buya Turay 38'	Stadium: Skytteholms IP; Attendance: 315; Referee: Johan Hamlin

23 August 2017	IFK Aspudden-Tellus (4)	1–3	Dalkurd FF (2)	Stockholm
18:30	Abdulla 45'	Report	Awad 20', 42'; Stadler 30'	Stadium: Aspuddens IP; Attendance: 1,157; Referee: Fredrik Hansson

23 August 2017	Arameiska-Syrianska IF (3)	0–2	IF Brommapojkarna (2)	Botkyrka
18:30		Report	Khalili 30'; Gerbino Polo 49'	Stadium: Brunna IP; Attendance: 569; Referee: Farouk Nehdi

23 August 2017	Sollentuna FK (3)	1–2	Syrianska FC (2)	Sollentuna
18:30	Ramsell 5' (pen.)	Report	Gacesa 54'; Hellberg 90+4'	Stadium: Sollentunavallen; Attendance: 300; Referee: Adam Ladebäck

23 August 2017	Bollnäs GIF (4)	0–5	IFK Norrköping (1)	Bollnäs
18:30		Report	Jakobsen 17'; Dagerstål 26'; Moberg Karlsson 37', 55'; Vall 78'	Stadium: Sävstaås IP; Attendance: 1,646; Referee: Arian Chalak

23 August 2017	Piteå IF FF (4)	0–0 (a.e.t.) (2–4 p)	Degerfors IF (2)	Piteå
18:30		Report		Stadium: LF Arena; Referee: Alexander Milovanovic
	Penalties
	Duckrell (penalty missed); Edström (penalty scored); Hammarstedt (penalty missed); Sundqvist (penalty scored)		(penalty scored) Ladan; (penalty scored) Abraham; (penalty scored) Mayambela; (penalty missed) Zackrisson; (penalty scored) Stankovic

23 August 2017	Gamla Upsala SK (4)	1–4	Djurgårdens IF (1)	Uppsala
18:30	Englund 37'	Report	Bohlin 18' (o.g.); Badji 75', 89'; Kristoffersen 83'	Stadium: Studenternas IP; Attendance: 1,286; Referee: Victor Wolf

23 August 2017	Carlstad United BK (3)	1–2	IK Sirius (1)	Karlstad
18:30	Lekiqi 24'	Report	Faour 19'; Gustafsson 55'	Stadium: Tingvalla IP; Attendance: 831; Referee: Antti Kanerva

23 August 2017	Landvetter IS (5)	0–5	IFK Göteborg (1)	Landvetter
18:30		Report	Ohlsson 27'; Ómarsson 50', 57', 69'; Nordström 55'	Stadium: Landvetter IP; Attendance: 4,800; Referee: Bojan Pandzic

23 August 2017	Oskarshamns AIK (3)	1–3	Helsingborgs IF (2)	Oskarshamn
18:30	Eliassi 19' (pen.)	Report	Timossi Andersson 8', 58'; Christensen 11'	Stadium: Arena Oskarshamn; Attendance: 1,082; Referee: Andreas Johansson

23 August 2017	Hittarps IK (4)	0–3	Varbergs BoIS (2)	Hittarp
18:30		Report	Palmquist 16', 50'; Arvidsson 55'	Stadium: Laröds IP; Referee: Haris Memisevic

23 August 2017	Lunds BK (4)	0–2	Norrby IF (2)	Lund
18:30		Report	Ståhl 53', 86' (pen.)	Stadium: Klostergårdens IP; Referee: Per Melin

23 August 2017	Landskrona BoIS (3)	3–4	IF Elfsborg (1)	Landskrona
18:30	Zahui 20'; Karim 36'; Nalić 60'	Report	Karlsson 6'; Bajrami 69', 114'; Lundevall 80'	Stadium: Landskrona IP; Attendance: 1,598; Referee: Kaspar Sjöberg

23 August 2017	Husqvarna FF (3)	2–5 (a.e.t.)	Östers IF (2)	Jönköping
18:30	Hamidović 2'; Bernholtz 68'	Report	Bajrović 24'; Björkén 87'; Kapčević 93'; Vasilj 100'; Crona 117'	Stadium: Stadsparksvallen; Attendance: 467; Referee: Joakim Östling

23 August 2017	Utsiktens BK (3)	2–3 (a.e.t.)	Jönköpings Södra IF (1)	Gothenburg
18:30	Westermark 25'; Book 80'	Report	Vilhjálmsson 57', 85', 115'	Stadium: Ruddalens IP; Attendance: 200; Referee: Magnus Lindgren

23 August 2017	FC Trollhättan (4)	1–4	Malmö FF (1)	Trollhättan
18:30	Kean 4'	Report	Jeremejeff 22'; Brorsson 44'; Berget 88' (pen.); Rakip 90'	Stadium: Edsborgs IP; Attendance: 3,200; Referee: Granit Maqedonci

24 August 2017	Assyriska IF (4)	0–1	Trelleborgs FF (2)	Norrköping
17:30		Report	Nilsson 78'	Stadium: Mamre IP; Attendance: 540; Referee: Mohammed Al-Hakim

24 August 2017	Enskede IK (3)	1–2 (a.e.t.)	Gefle IF (2)	Stockholm
18:30	Alriksson 35'	Report	Ajeti 85'; Johansson 115'	Stadium: Enskede IP; Attendance: 305; Referee: Jesper Ekwall

24 August 2017	Karlstad BK (4)	1–2	Örebro SK (1)	Karlstad
18:30	Moussally 5'	Report	Rogić 29'; Hines-Ike 39'	Stadium: Tingvalla IP; Attendance: 903; Referee: Jim Petersson

24 August 2017	Skövde AIK (3)	0–1	GAIS (2)	Skövde
18:30		Report	Sinclair 73'	Stadium: Södermalms IP; Referee: Alexander Pavlovic

24 August 2017	Nybro IF (4)	1–5	Kalmar FF (1)	Nybro
18:30	Sturresson 59'	Report	Mujkic 15' (o.g.); Edqvist 28', 43'; Eid 64'; Sachpekidis 70'	Stadium: Victoriavallen; Attendance: 2,426; Referee: Fredrik Klitte

24 August 2017	IK Oddevold (3)	2–1	Falkenbergs FF (2)	Uddevalla
18:30	Mikaelsson 18'; Karlsson 90'	Report	Chatto 16'	Stadium: Rimnersvallen; Referee: Nermin Cisic

10 October 2017	Härnösand FF (4)	0–2	Östersunds FK (1)	Härnösand
19:00		Report	Bertilsson 53'; Edwards 75'	Stadium: Högslättens IP; Attendance: 1,466; Referee: Niklas Abrahamsson

== Group stage ==
The 32 winners from round 2 were divided into eight groups of four teams. The 16 highest ranked winners from the previous rounds were seeded to the top two positions in each groups and the 16 remaining winners were unseeded in the draw. The ranking of the 16 seeded teams were decided by league position in the 2017 season. All teams in the group stage played each other once, the highest ranked teams from the previous rounds and teams from tier three or lower had the right to play two home matches.

=== Qualified teams ===
Seeded

- AIK (1)
- BK Häcken (1)
- Djurgårdens IF (1)
- GIF Sundsvall (1)
- Halmstads BK (1)
- Hammarby IF (1)
- IF Brommapojkarna (2)
- IF Elfsborg (1)
- IFK Göteborg (1)
- IFK Norrköping (1)
- IK Sirius (1)
- Jönköpings Södra IF (1)
- Kalmar FF (1)
- Malmö FF (1)
- Örebro SK (1)
- Östersunds FK (1)

Unseeded

- Dalkurd FF (2)
- Degerfors IF (2)
- GAIS (2)
- Gefle IF (2)
- Helsingborgs IF (2)
- IFK Värnamo (2)
- IK Frej Täby (2)
- IK Oddevold (3)
- Norrby IF (2)
- Syrianska FC (2)
- Trelleborgs FF (2)
- Tvååkers IF (4)
- Varbergs BoIS (2)
- Vasalunds IF (3)
- Åtvidabergs FF (2)
- Östers IF (2)

=== Group 1 ===
Pos	Team	Pld	W	D	L	GF	GA	GD	Pts	Qualification	MFF	IFB	DFF	GEF
1	Malmö FF	3	3	0	0	7	1	+6	9	Advance to Knockout stage	—	3–1	1–0	—
2	IF Brommapojkarna	3	2	0	1	5	3	+2	6		—	—	2–0	2–0
3	Dalkurd FF	3	0	1	2	2	5	−3	1		—	—	—	2–2
4	Gefle IF	3	0	1	2	2	7	−5	1		0–3	—	—	—

Source: Swedish Football Association
Rules for classification: 1) Points; 2) Goal difference; 3) Goals scored; 4) Head-to-head record; 5) Highest ranked team

18 February 2018 Matchday 1	Malmö FF (1)	1–0	Dalkurd FF (1)	Malmö
17:00	Rosenberg 87' (pen.)	Report		Stadium: Malmö IP; Attendance: 4,566; Referee: Magnus Lindgren

18 February 2018 Matchday 1	IF Brommapojkarna (1)	2–0	Gefle IF (2)	Stockholm
17:00	Sandberg Magnusson 56'; Ajeti 87'	Report		Stadium: Grimsta IP; Attendance: 110; Referee: Fredrik Klitte

25 February 2018 Matchday 2	IF Brommapojkarna (1)	2–0	Dalkurd FF (1)	Stockholm
15:00	Nikolić 30'; Rauschenberg 51'	Report		Stadium: Grimsta IP; Attendance: 600; Referee: Victor Wolf

25 February 2018 Matchday 2	Gefle IF (2)	0–3	Malmö FF (1)	Gävle
19:00		Report	Jeremejeff 18'; Bengtsson 24'; Strandberg 89'	Stadium: Gavlevallen; Attendance: 283; Referee: Glenn Nyberg

4 March 2018 Matchday 3	Dalkurd FF (1)	2–2	Gefle IF (2)	Gävle
17:00	Ahmed 33'; Sugita 57'	Report	Johansson 26'; Sandlund 88'	Stadium: Gavlevallen; Attendance: 250; Referee: Victor Wolf

4 March 2018 Matchday 3	Malmö FF (1)	3–1	IF Brommapojkarna (1)	Malmö
17:00	Jeremejeff 32'; Strandberg 47'; Svanberg 65'	Report	Ajeti 60'	Stadium: Malmö IP; Attendance: 3,155; Referee: Kristoffer Karlsson

=== Group 2 ===
Pos	Team	Pld	W	D	L	GF	GA	GD	Pts	Qualification	AIK	HBK	SFC	IKO
1	AIK	3	3	0	0	7	3	+4	9	Advance to Knockout stage	—	3–1	2–1	—
2	Halmstads BK	3	1	1	1	7	4	+3	4		—	—	5–0	—
3	Syrianska FC	3	1	0	2	6	10	−4	3		—	—	—	5–3
4	IK Oddevold	3	0	1	2	5	8	−3	1		1–2	1–1	—	—

Source: Swedish Football Association
Rules for classification: 1) Points; 2) Goal difference; 3) Goals scored; 4) Head-to-head record; 5) Highest ranked team

17 February 2018 Matchday 1	AIK (1)	2–1	Syrianska FC (3)	Stockholm
14:00	Goitom 13'; Yasin 52'	Report	Ercan 30'	Stadium: Tele2 Arena; Attendance: 8,000; Referee: Johan Krantz

17 February 2018 Matchday 1	IK Oddevold (3)	1–1	Halmstads BK (2)	Uddevalla
14:00	Krezić 29'	Report	Kinoshita 58'	Stadium: Kamratgården; Attendance: 408; Referee: Granit Maqedonci

24 February 2018 Matchday 2	IK Oddevold (3)	1–2	AIK (1)	Uddevalla
16:00	Selmani 43' (pen.)	Report	Elyounoussi 9'; Bahoui 25'	Stadium: Kamratgården; Attendance: 1,118; Referee: Mohammed Al-Hakim

24 February 2018 Matchday 2	Halmstads BK (2)	5–0	Syrianska FC (3)	Halmstad
16:00	Silfwer 11'; Kinoshita 33'; Gudmundsson 45'; Berntsson 54'; Rashidi 71'	Report		Stadium: Skedalaheds IP; Attendance: 288; Referee: Antti Kanerva

4 March 2018 Matchday 3	Syrianska FC (3)	5–3	IK Oddevold (3)	Södertälje
15:00	Hellberg 35'; Ada 63', 75'; Rajalakso 71', 84'	Report	Selmani 15', 82' (pen.); Alimi 90'	Stadium: Södertälje Fotbollsarena; Attendance: 100; Referee: Adam Ladebäck

4 March 2018 Matchday 3	AIK (1)	3–1	Halmstads BK (2)	Stockholm
15:00	Elyounoussi 6' (pen.); Olsson 69'; Lindkvist 88'	Report	Silfwer 60' (pen.)	Stadium: Tele2 Arena; Attendance: 7,828; Referee: Jonas Eriksson

=== Group 3 ===
Pos	Team	Pld	W	D	L	GF	GA	GD	Pts	Qualification	DIF	DEG	FRE	JSIF
1	Djurgårdens IF	3	3	0	0	8	0	+8	9	Advance to Knockout stage	—	6–0	—	1–0
2	Degerfors IF	3	1	1	1	4	8	−4	4		—	—	3–1	—
3	IK Frej Täby	3	1	0	2	3	5	−2	3		0–1	—	—	—
4	Jönköpings Södra IF	3	0	1	2	2	4	−2	1		—	1–1	1–2	—

Source: Swedish Football Association
Rules for classification: 1) Points; 2) Goal difference; 3) Goals scored; 4) Head-to-head record; 5) Highest ranked team

18 February 2018 Matchday 1	Jönköpings Södra IF (2)	1–2	IK Frej Täby (2)	Jönköping
15:00	Moberg 5'	Report	Gerbino Polo 10'; Stavrothanasopoulos 42'	Stadium: Tipshallen Elmia; Attendance: 765; Referee: Per Mellin

19 February 2018 Matchday 1	Djurgårdens IF (1)	6–0	Degerfors IF (2)	Stockholm
19:00	Radetinac 16', 90'; Mrabti 33'; Augustinsson 48'; Kadewere 51', 55'	Report		Stadium: Tele2 Arena; Attendance: 5,568; Referee: Antti Kanerva

24 February 2018 Matchday 2	IK Frej Täby (2)	0–1	Djurgårdens IF (1)	Täby
12:00		Report	Gunnarsson 75'	Stadium: Vikingavallen; Attendance: 2,516; Referee: Magnus Lindgren

25 February 2018 Matchday 2	Jönköpings Södra IF (2)	1–1	Degerfors IF (2)	Jönköping
17:00	Thelin 90+4'	Report	Nilsson 64'	Stadium: Tipshallen Elmia; Attendance: 512; Referee: Fredrik Klitte

3 March 2018 Matchday 3	Degerfors IF (2)	3–1	IK Frej Täby (2)	Degerfors
14:00	Ekroth 42'; Jansson 81'; Abraham 89'	Report	Gerbino Polo 83'	Stadium: Stora Valla; Attendance: 136; Referee: Fredrik Hansson

3 March 2018 Matchday 3	Djurgårdens IF (1)	1–0	Jönköpings Södra IF (2)	Stockholm
14:00	Walker 84'	Report		Stadium: Tele2 Arena; Attendance: 4,005; Referee: Stefan Johannesson

=== Group 4 ===
Pos	Team	Pld	W	D	L	GF	GA	GD	Pts	Qualification	BKH	SUN	VÄR	NBY
1	BK Häcken	3	2	1	0	7	1	+6	7	Advance to Knockout stage	—	1–1	2–0	—
2	GIF Sundsvall	3	2	1	0	7	4	+3	7		—	—	2–1	4–2
3	IFK Värnamo	3	1	0	2	2	4	−2	3		—	—	—	1–0
4	Norrby IF	3	0	0	3	2	9	−7	0		0–4	—	—	—

Source: Swedish Football Association
Rules for classification: 1) Points; 2) Goal difference; 3) Goals scored; 4) Head-to-head record; 5) Highest ranked team

17 February 2018 Matchday 1	GIF Sundsvall (1)	4–2	Norrby IF (2)	Sundsvall
16:00	Wilson 21', 48'; Gall 55'; Hallenius 74'	Report	Nilsson 63'; Yarsuvat 88'	Stadium: Nordichallen; Attendance: 350; Referee: Fredrik Hansson

18 February 2018 Matchday 1	BK Häcken (1)	2–0	IFK Värnamo (2)	Gothenburg
17:00	Irandust 52'; Paulinho 84' (pen.)	Report		Stadium: Bravida Arena; Attendance: 623; Referee: Robert Daradić

24 February 2018 Matchday 2	GIF Sundsvall (1)	2–1	IFK Värnamo (2)	Sundsvall
14:00	Hallenius 4'; Gall 75'	Report	Achinioti-Jönsson 23'	Stadium: Nordichallen; Attendance: 333; Referee: Farouk Nehdi

25 February 2018 Matchday 2	Norrby IF (2)	0–4	BK Häcken (1)	Borås
15:00		Report	Irandust 7'; Arkivuo 27'; Paulinho 42'; Friberg 67'	Stadium: Borås Arena; Attendance: 145; Referee: Granit Maqedonci

3 March 2018 Matchday 3	IFK Värnamo (2)	1–0	Norrby IF (2)	Värnamo
16:00	Ask 14'	Report		Stadium: Finnvedsvallen; Attendance: 115; Referee: Per Melin

3 March 2018 Matchday 3	BK Häcken (1)	1–1	GIF Sundsvall (1)	Gothenburg
16:00	Kamara 68'	Report	Skoglund 24'	Stadium: Bravida Arena; Attendance: 623; Referee: Patrik Eriksson

=== Group 5 ===
Pos	Team	Pld	W	D	L	GF	GA	GD	Pts	Qualification	ÖFK	KFF	TFF	ÅFF
1	Östersunds FK	3	3	0	0	8	0	+8	9	Advance to Knockout stage	—	3–0	3–0	—
2	Kalmar FF	3	1	1	1	2	4	−2	4		—	—	2–1	0–0
3	Trelleborgs FF	3	1	0	2	4	5	−1	3		—	—	—	3–0
4	Åtvidabergs FF	3	0	1	2	0	5	−5	1		0–2	—	—	—

Source: Swedish Football Association
Rules for classification: 1) Points; 2) Goal difference; 3) Goals scored; 4) Head-to-head record; 5) Highest ranked team

9 February 2018 Matchday 1	Östersunds FK (1)	3–0	Trelleborgs FF (1)	Östersund
19:00	Islamović 9'; Tekie 76'; Pettersson 90+2'	Report		Stadium: Jämtkraft Arena; Attendance: 1,546; Referee: Jonas Eriksson

17 February 2018 Matchday 1	Kalmar FF (1)	0–0	Åtvidabergs FF (3)	Kalmar
14:00		Report		Stadium: Gasten IP; Attendance: 393; Referee: Mirza Kazić

25 February 2018 Matchday 2	Kalmar FF (1)	2–1	Trelleborgs FF (1)	Kalmar
17:00	Romário 24', 45' (pen.)	Report	Hörberg 2'	Stadium: Gasten IP; Attendance: 237; Referee: Andreas Ekberg

26 February 2018 Matchday 2	Åtvidabergs FF (3)	0–2	Östersunds FK (1)	Åtvidaberg
19:00		Report	Ghoddos 65'; Hopcutt 89'	Stadium: Kopparvallen; Attendance: 508; Referee: Johan Krantz

3 March 2018 Matchday 3	Trelleborgs FF (1)	3–0	Åtvidabergs FF (3)	Trelleborg
14:00	Jovanović 58'; Hümmet 76'; Christoffersson 86'	Report		Stadium: Vångavallen; Attendance: 112; Referee: Mirza Kazić

3 March 2018 Matchday 3	Östersunds FK (1)	3–0	Kalmar FF (1)	Östersund
14:00	Nouri 26' (pen.); Ghoddos 29'; Islamović 77'	Report		Stadium: Jämtkraft Arena; Attendance: 1,729; Referee: Kaspar Sjöberg

=== Group 6 ===
Pos	Team	Pld	W	D	L	GF	GA	GD	Pts	Qualification	ÖSK	HEL	NOR	TVÅ
1	Örebro SK	3	1	2	0	6	3	+3	5	Advance to Knockout stage	—	1–1	—	—
2	Helsingborgs IF	3	1	2	0	5	2	+3	5		—	—	—	3–0
3	IFK Norrköping	3	1	2	0	6	5	+1	5		2–2	1–1	—	—
4	Tvååkers IF	3	0	0	3	2	9	−7	0		0–3	—	2–3	—

Source: Swedish Football Association
Rules for classification: 1) Points; 2) Goal difference; 3) Goals scored; 4) Head-to-head record; 5) Highest ranked team

17 February 2018 Matchday 1	IFK Norrköping (1)	1–1	Helsingborgs IF (2)	Norrköping
16:00	Johansson 90+1'	Report	Johansson 27'	Stadium: Östgötaporten; Attendance: 1,870; Referee: Glenn Nyberg

18 February 2018 Matchday 1	Tvååkers IF (3)	0–3	Örebro SK (1)	Tvååker
15:00		Report	Igboananike 42'; Besara 82', 90+2'	Stadium: Övrevi; Attendance: 176; Referee: Nermin Cisić

24 February 2018 Matchday 2	Tvååkers IF (3)	2–3	IFK Norrköping (1)	Tvååker
14:00	Johansson 34'; Nedanovski 45'	Report	Jakobsen 66'; Thern 76'; Fjóluson 90'	Stadium: Övrevi; Attendance: 213; Referee: Mirza Kazić

24 February 2018 Matchday 2	Örebro SK (1)	1–1	Helsingborgs IF (2)	Örebro
14:00	Igboananike 90+4'	Report	Dahlberg 76'	Stadium: Behrn Arena; Attendance: 791; Referee: Kaspar Sjöberg

3 March 2018 Matchday 3	Helsingborgs IF (2)	3–0	Tvååkers IF (3)	Helsingborg
16:00	Bjarnason 34', 44'; Timossi Andersson 90+3'	Report		Stadium: Olympiafältet; Attendance: 1,067; Referee: Antti Kanerva

3 March 2018 Matchday 3	IFK Norrköping (1)	2–2	Örebro SK (1)	Norrköping
16:00	Jakobsen 57'; Holmberg 82'	Report	Besara 58'; Rogić 90'	Stadium: Östgötaporten; Attendance: 1,864; Referee: Glenn Nyberg

=== Group 7 ===
Pos	Team	Pld	W	D	L	GF	GA	GD	Pts	Qualification	IFKG	ÖIF	VAR	IKS
1	IFK Göteborg	3	1	2	0	4	3	+1	5	Advance to Knockout stage	—	1–1	1–0	—
2	Östers IF	3	1	2	0	4	3	+1	5		—	—	2–1	—
3	Varbergs BoIS	3	1	0	2	3	4	−1	3		—	—	—	2–1
4	IK Sirius	3	0	2	1	4	5	−1	2		2–2	1–1	—	—

Source: Swedish Football Association
Rules for classification: 1) Points; 2) Goal difference; 3) Goals scored; 4) Head-to-head record; 5) Highest ranked team

17 February 2018 Matchday 1	IK Sirius (1)	1–1	Östers IF (2)	Uppsala
16:00	Vecchia 72'	Report	Helg 43'	Stadium: Lötens IP; Attendance: 900; Referee: Victor Wolf

17 February 2018 Matchday 1	IFK Göteborg (1)	1–0	Varbergs BoIS (2)	Gothenburg
16:00	Ómarsson 75'	Report		Stadium: Bravida Arena; Attendance: 2,410; Referee: Kristoffer Karlsson

24 February 2018 Matchday 2	IFK Göteborg (1)	1–1	Östers IF (2)	Gothenburg
14:00	Diskerud 67'	Report	Helg 18'	Stadium: Bravida Arena; Attendance: 2,041; Referee: Adam Ladebäck

25 February 2018 Matchday 2	Varbergs BoIS (2)	2–1	IK Sirius (1)	Tvååker
15:00	Girmai Netabay 22'; Beqaj 63'	Report	Vecchia 40'	Stadium: Övrevi; Attendance: 421; Referee: Robert Daradić

4 March 2018 Matchday 3	Östers IF (2)	2–1	Varbergs BoIS (2)	Växjö
17:00	Johannesson 58', 90+5'	Report	Bergman 90+3'	Stadium: Växjö Tipshall; Attendance: 953; Referee: Magnus Lindgren

4 March 2018 Matchday 3	IK Sirius (1)	2–2	IFK Göteborg (1)	Uppsala
17:00	Arvidsson 50'; Nygren 90'	Report	Ómarsson 54'; Ohlsson 84'	Stadium: Lötens IP; Attendance: 571; Referee: Mohammed Al-Hakim

=== Group 8 ===
Pos	Team	Pld	W	D	L	GF	GA	GD	Pts	Qualification	GAIS	IFE	HAM	VAS
1	GAIS	3	2	1	0	10	5	+5	7	Advance to Knockout stage	—	—	—	4–0
2	IF Elfsborg	3	2	0	1	8	4	+4	6		2–3	—	2–1	—
3	Hammarby IF	3	1	1	1	7	6	+1	4		3–3	—	—	3–1
4	Vasalunds IF	3	0	0	3	1	11	−10	0		—	0–4	1–3	—

Source: Swedish Football Association
Rules for classification: 1) Points; 2) Goal difference; 3) Goals scored; 4) Head-to-head record; 5) Highest ranked team

18 February 2018 Matchday 1	Vasalunds IF (4)	1–3	Hammarby IF (1)	Stockholm
15:00	Traore 75'	Report	Hamad 6', 27' (pen.); Martinsson Ngouali 52'	Stadium: Tele2 Arena; Attendance: 5,207; Referee: Farouk Nehdi

19 February 2018 Matchday 1	IF Elfsborg (1)	2–3	GAIS (2)	Borås
19:00	Nilsson 12'; Jebali 23'	Report	Östling 12'; Djuric 27'; Hamidovic 52'	Stadium: Borås Arena; Attendance: 798; Referee: Kaspar Sjöberg

25 February 2018 Matchday 2	Vasalunds IF (4)	0–4	IF Elfsborg (1)	Solna
17:00		Report	Nilsson 16'; Drešević 45'; Prodell 79'; Jebali 80'	Stadium: Skytteholms IP; Attendance: 162; Referee: Nermin Cisić

25 February 2018 Matchday 2	Hammarby IF (1)	3–3	GAIS (2)	Stockholm
17:00	Svendsen 17'; Dibba 73'; Khalili 90'	Report	Hamidović 19', 70'; Wängberg 38'	Stadium: Tele2 Arena; Attendance: 7,108; Referee: Kristoffer Karlsson

4 March 2018 Matchday 3	GAIS (2)	4–0	Vasalunds IF (4)	Gothenburg
15:00	Hamidović 5', 49'; Barny 45'; Zeljković 90'	Report		Stadium: Bravida Arena; Attendance: 581; Referee: Nermin Cisić

4 March 2018 Matchday 3	IF Elfsborg (1)	2–1	Hammarby IF (1)	Borås
15:00	Frick 36'; Holmén 79' (pen.)	Report	Bakirciouglu 87'	Stadium: Borås Arena; Attendance: 789; Referee: Andreas Ekberg

== Knock-out stage ==
=== Qualified teams ===
Pos	Grp	Team	Pld	W	D	L	GF	GA	GD	Pts	Qualification
1	3	Djurgårdens IF	3	3	0	0	8	0	+8	9	Seeded in Quarter-final draw
2	5	Östersunds FK	3	3	0	0	8	0	+8	9	Seeded in Quarter-final draw
3	1	Malmö FF	3	3	0	0	7	1	+6	9	Seeded in Quarter-final draw
4	2	AIK	3	3	0	0	7	3	+4	9	Seeded in Quarter-final draw
5	4	BK Häcken	3	2	1	0	7	1	+6	7	Unseeded in Quarter-final draw
6	8	GAIS	3	2	1	0	10	5	+5	7	Unseeded in Quarter-final draw
7	6	Örebro SK	3	1	2	0	6	3	+3	5	Unseeded in Quarter-final draw
8	7	IFK Göteborg	3	1	2	0	4	3	+1	5	Unseeded in Quarter-final draw

Source: Group results
Rules for classification: 1) Points; 2) Goal difference; 3) Goals scored; 4) Ranking in 2017 season

=== Bracket ===
Quarter-finals
13 March – Solna
AIK	2
Örebro SK	0
12 March – Stockholm
Djurgårdens IF	1
BK Häcken	0
11 March – Östersund
Östersunds FK	1
GAIS	0
10 March – Malmö
Malmö FF	1
IFK Göteborg	0

Semi-finals
18 March – Solna
AIK	0
Djurgårdens IF	2
17 March – Östersund
Östersunds FK	0
Malmö FF	1

Final
10 May – Stockholm
Djurgårdens IF	3
Malmö FF	0

=== Quarter-finals ===
The quarter-finals consisted of the eight teams that won their respective group in the previous round. The four best group winners were seeded and drawn against the other four group winners, with the seeded teams entitled to play the match at their home venue. GAIS was the lowest ranked team in the quarter-finals as they are playing in the second tier, Superettan, for the 2018 season, while the other teams are playing in the top tier, Allsvenskan.

The draw for the quarter-finals and semi-finals was held on 4 March 2018.

10 March 2018	Malmö FF (1)	1–0	IFK Göteborg (1)	Malmö
13:00	Nielsen 18'	Report		Stadium: Malmö IP; Attendance: 4,135; Referee: Glenn Nyberg

11 March 2018	Östersunds FK (1)	1–0	GAIS (2)	Östersund
17:00	Gero 86'	Report		Stadium: Jämtkraft Arena; Attendance: 2,620; Referee: Patrik Eriksson

12 March 2018	Djurgårdens IF (1)	1–0	BK Häcken (1)	Stockholm
19:00	Kadewere 77'	Report		Stadium: Tele2 Arena; Attendance: 6,697; Referee: Mohammed Al-Hakim

13 March 2018	AIK (1)	2–0	Örebro SK (1)	Solna
18:30	Elyounoussi 12'; Silva 90+1'	Report		Stadium: Friends Arena; Attendance: 7,679; Referee: Kristofer Karlsson

=== Semi-finals ===
The semi-finals consisted of the four teams that won their respective quarter-finals in the previous round. All teams that qualified to this round are playing in the top tier, Allsvenskan, for the 2018 season.

The draw for the quarter-finals and semi-finals was held on 4 March 2018.

17 March 2018	Östersunds FK (1)	0–1	Malmö FF (1)	Östersund
18:15		Report	Traustason 79'	Stadium: Jämtkraft Arena; Attendance: 3,416; Referee: Mohammed Al-Hakim

18 March 2018	AIK (1)	0–2	Djurgårdens IF (1)	Solna
18:15		Report	Kadewere 46'; Mrabti 67'	Stadium: Friends Arena; Attendance: 21,200; Referee: Andreas Ekberg

=== Final ===
10 May 2018
15:00

Djurgårdens IF (1)	3–0	Malmö FF (1)
Une Larsson 17'; Mrabti 47'; Ring 81'	Report

Tele2 Arena, Stockholm
Attendance: 25,123
Referee: Bojan Pandžić
