= 2016–17 Svenska Cupen =

Tournament details
- Country: Sweden
- Dates: 3 August 2016 – 13 April 2017
- Teams: 96 (competition proper)

Final positions
- Champions: Östersunds FK
- Runners-up: IFK Norrköping

Tournament statistics
- Matches played: 119
- Top goal scorer: Kalle Holmberg (10 goals)

The 2016–17 Svenska Cupen was the 61st season of Svenska Cupen and the fifth season with the current format. The winners of the competition will earn a place in the second qualifying round of the 2017–18 UEFA Europa League, unless they have already qualified for European competition in the 2017–18 season, in which case the qualification spot will go to fourth-placed team of the 2016 Allsvenskan.

A total of 96 clubs will enter the competition.

The first two rounds were scheduled to be played before 3 August and 24 August 2016 respectively. The first round draw was announced on 21 April 2016, and the draw for the second round was announced on 7 July 2016.

The group stage will be played on the last two weekends in February 2017, and the last group stage round will be played on 5 and 6 March 2017. The following quarter-finals and semi-finals are scheduled to be played on the weekend of 12 March and 19 March 2017 respectively, before the tournament ends with the final on 13 or 14 April 2017.

== Round and draw dates ==
The schedule of the competition is as follows.

Phase	Round	Draw date and time	Match date
Initial rounds	Round 1	21 April 2016	3 August 2016 (latest)
Initial rounds	Round 2	7 July 2016	24–25 August 2016
Group stage	Matchday 1	TBD	18–19 February 2017
Group stage	Matchday 2	TBD	25–26 February 2017
Group stage	Matchday 3	TBD	4–5 March 2017
Knockout stage	Quarter-finals	TBD	12 March 2017
Knockout stage	Semi-finals	TBD	19 March 2017
Knockout stage	Final	TBD	13 or 14 April 2017

== Qualifying rounds ==
The associations of the Swedish District Football Associations could choose to have qualifying rounds or having teams being determined through district championships or by club ranking in 2015.

== Round 1 ==
64 teams from the third tier or lower of the Swedish league system will compete in this round. The matches will be played on 3 August 2016 at the latest.

17 May 2016	Sollentuna FF (4)	2–1	Vasalunds IF (3)	Sollentuna
20:00	Ramsell 24' (pen.); Thorstensson 83'	Report	Jurkovic 81'	Stadium: Sollentunavallen; Attendance: 100; Referee: Richard Holöien

1 June 2016	FC Rosengård 1917 (4)	2–4	FC Höllviken (3)	Malmö
19:00	Thorstensson 61'; Ramadan 64'	Report	Sekiraca 8'; Mesic 34' (o.g.); Wihlborg 54'; Persson 67'	Stadium: Rosengårds IP; Attendance: 75; Referee: Jakob Magnetorp

1 June 2016	Onsala BK (6)	4–1	Västra Frölunda IF (5)	Onsala
19:00	Andersson 4', 12'; Fogelblad 44'; Brandin 88'	Report	Ayoub 29'	Stadium: Rydets IP; Referee: Haris Memisevic

8 June 2016	Huddinge IF (4)	2–2 (a.e.t.) (2–4 p)	Enskede IK (3)	Huddinge
19:00	Aziz 57'; Vasic 87'	Report	Nobell 83', 89'	Stadium: Källbrinks IP; Attendance: 160; Referee: Mikael Devletyan Gudmundsson
	Penalties
	Vasic (penalty scored); Engqvist (penalty missed); Micic (penalty missed); Ålund (penalty scored)		Dahl (penalty scored); Wiking (penalty scored); Ahmed (penalty missed); Nobell (penalty scored); Alriksson (penalty scored)

8 June 2016	Åby IF (6)	0–5	Nyköpings BIS (3)	Åby
19:00		Report	Gall 10', 31'; Hansebjer 38', 66'; Sheriff 90'	Stadium: Åby IP; Attendance: 125; Referee: Josef Alacam

14 June 2016	IS Halmia (4)	1–4	Landskrona BoIS (3)	Halmstad
19:00	Sise 20'	Report	Pivkovski 9', 22'; Tkacz 25'; Levi 35'	Stadium: Örjans Vall; Referee: Bartek Svaberg

15 June 2016	Gnosjö IF (5)	4–2	Assyriska Turabdin IK (5)	Gnosjö
19:00	Ferizi 31'; Hussein 58' (o.g.); Sjerotanovic 72'; Björnell 90+5'	Report	Tegström 51'; Ismael 66'	Stadium: Töllshov; Referee: Ajdin Mlivic

15 June 2016	Grebbestads IF (4)	3–1	Qviding FIF (3)	Grebbestad
19:00	Kristoffersson 31'; Henriksson 55', 72'	Report	Örtendahl 90+1'	Stadium: Siljevi; Referee: Adnan Busuladzic

15 June 2016	Procyon BK (6)	0–4	Gamla Upsala SK (4)	Uppsala
19:30		Report	Morger 4'; Yaldir 14'; Mellberg 58' (pen.), 90'	Stadium: Stenhagens IP; Referee: Johan Thalin

15 June 2016	Kållered SK (6)	1–5	Utsiktens BK (3)	Kållered
19:30	de Broen 18'	Report	Westermark 8'; Gunnarsson 22' (o.g.); Rosén 38'; Mogren 44'; Hegab 74'	Stadium: Kållereds IP; Referee: Marcus Lundgren

21 June 2016	Dalhem IF (5)	1–3	IF Brommapojkarna (3)	Dalhem
19:00	Öhman 65'	Report	Ortmark 31'; Gustafsson 73'; Reuterswärd 85'	Stadium: Dalhem IP; Referee: Adam Ladebäck

22 June 2016	Ytterhogdals IK (5)	7–1	Team TG FF (3)	Ytterhogdal
19:00	Hainault 5'; Pearce 30'; Hardey 44', 54'; Edwards 68', 75', 90'	Report	McNeil 85'	Stadium: Svedjevallen; Referee: Arian Chalak

27 June 2016	Enhörna IF (6)	2–3	Västerås SK (3)	Enhörna
19:00	Mete 7'; Lärnestad 82'	Report	Andersson 44'; Sulaiman 77'; Tronét 82'	Stadium: Friluftsgården; Referee: Nael Ghazi Shabo

28 July 2016	IK Klockaretorpet (7)	0–1	Smedby AIS (4)	Norrköping
19:00		Report	Sinanović 64'	Stadium: Klockaretorpsplanen

28 July 2016	IFK Fjärås (5)	2–3	Torslanda IK (4)	Fjärås kyrkby
19:00		Report		Stadium: Ögärdets IP

2 August 2016	Österlen FF (5)	0–2	Kristianstad FC (3)	Skillinge
18:30		Report	Netabay 9'; Emeh 17'	Stadium: Skillinge IP

2 August 2016	IF Viken (6)	3–2	SK Sifhälla (6)	Åmål
19:00		Report		Stadium: Rösvallen

2 August 2016	IFK Tidaholm (5)	0–1	Lidköpings FK (4)	Tidaholm
19:00		Report		Stadium: Tidavallen

2 August 2016	Vimmerby IF (4)	0–4	Oskarshamns AIK (3)	Vimmerby
19:00		Report		Stadium: Skobes Arena

3 August 2016	Härnösands FF (4)	0–4	IFK Luleå (3)	Härnösand
18:00		Report

3 August 2016	Ronneby BK (6)	1–2	Växjö BK (6)	Ronneby
18:30		Report		Stadium: Brunnsvallen

3 August 2016	Kubikenborgs IF (5)	0–1	Söderhamns FF (4)	Sundsvall
19:00		Report		Stadium: Kubikenborgs IP

3 August 2016	Arameiska-Syrianska IF (4)	4–2	Akropolis IF (3)	Norsborg
19:00		Report		Stadium: Brunna IP

3 August 2016	Sandvikens IF (4)	3–0	IK Brage (3)	Sandviken
19:00		Report		Stadium: Jernvallen

3 August 2016	Karlstad BK (4)	3–2	BK Forward (3)	Karlstad
19:00		Report		Stadium: Våxnäs IP

3 August 2016	Vänersborgs IF (5)	0–1	Vänersborgs FK (4)	Vänersborg
19:00		Report		Stadium: Vänersvallen

3 August 2016	IFK Falköping (5)	0–2	IK Gauthiod (4)	Falköping
19:00		Report		Stadium: Odenplan

3 August 2016	Myresjö/Vetlanda FK (5)	0–5	Östers IF (3)	Myresjö
19:00		Report		Stadium: Myrvalla

3 August 2016	Eskilsminne IF (4)	1–2 (a.e.t.)	IFK Hässleholm (4)	Helsingborg
19:00		Report		Stadium: Harlyckans IP

3 August 2016	IFK Trelleborg (5)	1–1 (a.e.t.) (6–7 p)	Torns IF (4)	Trelleborg
19:00		Report		Stadium: Vångavallen

3 August 2016	IFK Haninge (5)	3–4 (a.e.t.)	BKV Norrtälje (4)	Haninge
20:00		Report		Stadium: Torvalla IP

3 August 2016	Täby FK (5)	3–2	Boo FK (4)	Täby
20:00		Report		Stadium: Tibblevallen

== Round 2 ==
All teams from 2016 Allsvenskan and 2016 Superettan enter in this round, 32 teams in total, where they will be joined by the 32 winners from round 1. The 32 teams from Allsvenskan and Superettan were seeded and will play against the 32 winners from round 1, the matches will be played at the home venues for the unseeded teams. The 16 northernmost seeded teams were drawn against the 16 northernmost unseeded teams and the same with the southernmost teams.

The draw for the second round was held on 7 July 2016, and the matches will be played on 24 and 25 August 2016, but some matches may be moved to a later date depending on participation in 2016–17 UEFA Champions League and 2016–17 UEFA Europa League. The number in brackets indicates what tier of Swedish football each team competed in during the 2016 season.

24 August 2016	IF Viken (6)	0–9	Degerfors IF (2)
18:00		Report

24 August 2016	IFK Luleå (3)	0–2	AIK (1)
18:00		Report

24 August 2016	Nyköpings BIS (3)	2–1	AFC United (2)
18:00		Report

24 August 2016	Ytterhogdals IK (5)	2–2 (a.e.t.) (4–2 p)	Syrianska FC (2)
18:00		Report

24 August 2016	Torslanda IK (4)	0–2	IFK Värnamo (2)
18:00		Report

24 August 2016	Gnosjö IF (5)	0–4	Helsingborgs IF (1)
18:00		Report

24 August 2016	Grebbestads IF (4)	0–3	Kalmar FF (1)
18:00		Report

24 August 2016	Lidköpings FK (4)	0–2	Trelleborgs FF (2)
18:15		Report

24 August 2016	Karlstad BK (4)	0–4	Örebro SK (1)
18:30		Report

24 August 2016	Onsala BK (6)	0–6	Ängelholms FF (2)
18:30		Report

24 August 2016	Smedby AIS (4)	1–5	Djurgårdens IF (1)
19:00		Report

24 August 2016	Söderhamns FF (4)	0–1	Gefle IF (1)
19:00		Report

24 August 2016	Sandvikens IF (4)	1–2	Åtvidabergs FF (2)
19:00		Report

24 August 2016	Enskede IK (3)	0–3	IK Sirius (2)
19:00		Report

24 August 2016	Arameiska-Syrianska IF (4)	3–0	Assyriska FF (2)
19:00		Report

24 August 2016	IF Brommapojkarna (3)	4–2	IK Frej (2)
19:00		Report

24 August 2016	Östers IF (3)	0–3	GAIS (2)
19:00		Report

24 August 2016	Utsiktens BK (3)	0–4	Falkenbergs FF (1)
19:00		Report

24 August 2016	Vänersborgs FK (4)	2–0	Jönköpings Södra IF (1)
19:00		Report

24 August 2016	Växjö BK (6)	1–11	BK Häcken (1)
19:00		Report

24 August 2016	Gamla Upsala SK (4)	1–2	Hammarby IF (1)
19:30		Report

24 August 2016	Västerås SK (3)	0–4	IFK Norrköping (1)
20:00		Report

24 August 2016	Täby FK (5)	0–2	Dalkurd FF (2)
20:00		Report

25 August 2016	FC Höllviken (3)	1–2 (a.e.t.)	Örgryte IS (2)
17:30		Report

25 August 2016	Torns IF (4)	1–3	Varbergs BoIS (2)
18:00		Report

25 August 2016	Kristianstad FC (3)	3–3 (a.e.t.) (3–2 p)	Ljungskile SK (2)
18:15		Report

25 August 2016	IK Gauthiod (4)	0–7	IF Elfsborg (1)
18:15		Report

25 August 2016	BKV Norrtälje (4)	1–0	GIF Sundsvall (1)
19:00		Report

25 August 2016	Landskrona BoIS (3)	3–1	Malmö FF (1)
19:00		Report

25 August 2016	IFK Hässleholm (4)	0–4	Halmstads BK (2)
19:00		Report

6 September 2016	Sollentuna FF (4)	0–2	Östersunds FK (1)
19:00		Report

13 October 2016	Oskarshamns AIK (3)	0–6	IFK Göteborg (1)
18:30		Report

== Group stage ==
The 32 winners from round 2 will be divided into eight groups of four teams. The 16 highest ranked winners from the previous rounds will be seeded to the top two positions in each groups and the 16 remaining winners will be unseeded in the draw. The ranking of the 16 seeded teams will be decided by league position in the 2016 season. All teams in the group stage play each other once, the highest ranked teams from the previous rounds and teams from tier three or lower have the right to play two home matches.

The group stage will begin on 18 February and conclude on 5 March 2017.

All times listed below are in Central European Time (UTC+1). (Note: This is the time zone of Sweden during the winter when group stage is played.)

=== Tie-breaking criteria ===
If two or more teams are equal on points on completion of the group matches, the following criteria will be applied to determine the rankings

1. Superior goal difference
2. Higher number of goals scored
3. Result between the teams in question
4. Higher league position in the 2016 season

=== Qualified teams ===
Seeded

- AIK (1)
- BK Häcken (1)
- Dalkurd FF (2)
- Djurgårdens IF (1)
- Falkenbergs FF (1)
- Gefle IF (1)
- Halmstads BK (2)
- Hammarby IF (1)
- Helsingborgs IF (1)
- IF Elfsborg (1)
- IFK Göteborg (1)
- IFK Norrköping (1)
- IK Sirius (2)
- Kalmar FF (1)
- Örebro SK (1)
- Östersunds FK (1)

Unseeded

- Arameiska-Syrianska IF (4)
- BKV Norrtälje (4)
- GAIS (2)
- Degerfors IF (2)
- IF Brommapojkarna (3)
- IFK Värnamo (2)
- Kristianstad FC (3)
- Landskrona BoIS (3)
- Nyköpings BIS (3)
- Trelleborgs FF (2)
- Varbergs BoIS (2)
- Vänersborgs FK (4)
- Ytterhogdals IK (5)
- Åtvidabergs FF (2)
- Ängelholms FF (2) (withdrew and were replaced by Ljungskile SK.)
- Örgryte IS (2)

=== Group 1 ===
Pos	Team	Pld	W	D	L	GF	GA	GD	Pts	Qualification	AIK	DFF	KFC	GAIS
1	AIK	3	2	1	0	4	0	+4	7	Advance to Knockout stage	—	0–0	—	1–0
2	Dalkurd FF	3	1	2	0	3	1	+2	5		—	—	—	2–2
3	Kristianstad FC	3	1	0	2	3	7	−4	3		0–3	1–3	—	—
4	GAIS	3	0	1	2	3	5	−2	1		—	—	1–2	—

Source: Swedish Football Association
Rules for classification: 1) Points; 2) Goal difference; 3) Goals scored; 4) Head-to-head record; 5) Highest ranked team

18 February 2017 Matchday 1	Kristianstad FC (3)	1–3	Dalkurd FF (2)	Kristianstad
14:00	Clason 13'	Report	Rashidi 55'; Ekroth 72' (o.g.); Bangura 89'	Stadium: Kristianstads IP; Attendance: 350; Referee: Andreas Ekberg

19 February 2017 Matchday 1	AIK (1)	1–0	GAIS (2)	Solna
14:00	Avdić 4'	Report		Stadium: Skytteholms IP; Attendance: 3,495; Referee: Mohammed Al-Hakim

25 February 2017 Matchday 2	Kristianstad FC (3)	0–3	AIK (1)	Kristianstad
14:00		Report	Blomberg 16'; Åberg 21' (o.g.); Karlsson 87'	Stadium: Kristianstads IP; Attendance: 1,812; Referee: Jonas Karlsson

25 February 2017 Matchday 2	Dalkurd FF (2)	2–2	GAIS (2)	Borlänge
14:00	Ahmed 5'; Lawan 45'	Report	Sinclair 57'; Leksell 90'	Stadium: Domnarvsvallen; Attendance: 305; Referee: Jim Petersson

5 March 2017 Matchday 3	GAIS (2)	1–2	Kristianstad FC (3)	Gothenburg
16:00	Ekroth 6' (o.g.)	Report	Kamp 54'; Åberg 68'	Stadium: Valhalla IP; Attendance: 511; Referee: Nermin Cisic

5 March 2017 Matchday 3	AIK (1)	0–0	Dalkurd FF (2)	Solna
16:00		Report		Stadium: Skytteholms IP; Attendance: 3,540; Referee: Patrik Eriksson

=== Group 2 ===
Pos	Team	Pld	W	D	L	GF	GA	GD	Pts	Qualification	IFKN	VFK	HBK	ÖIS
1	IFK Norrköping	3	1	2	0	10	3	+7	5	Advance to Knockout stage	—	—	7–0	1–1
2	Vänersborgs FK	3	1	2	0	7	5	+2	5		2–2	—	2–2	—
3	Halmstads BK	3	1	1	1	6	9	−3	4		—	—	—	4–0
4	Örgryte IS	3	0	1	2	2	8	−6	1		—	1–3	—	—

Source: Swedish Football Association
Rules for classification: 1) Points; 2) Goal difference; 3) Goals scored; 4) Head-to-head record; 5) Highest ranked team

18 February 2017 Matchday 1	Vänersborgs FK (4)	2–2	Halmstads BK (1)	Vänersborg
14:00	Gashi 27', 73'	Report	Olsson 70'; Mathisen 86'	Stadium: Vänersvallen; Attendance: 812; Referee: Antti Kanerva

19 February 2017 Matchday 1	IFK Norrköping (1)	1–1	Örgryte IS (2)	Norrköping
16:00	Holmberg 73'	Report	Johansson 86'	Stadium: Östgötaporten; Attendance: 2,155; Referee: Kristoffer Karlsson

25 February 2017 Matchday 2	Vänersborgs FK (4)	2–2	IFK Norrköping (1)	Vänersborg
14:00	Vekić 25', 62'	Report	Bärkroth 46'; Holmberg 55'	Stadium: Vänersvallen; Attendance: 856; Referee: Robert Daradic

25 February 2017 Matchday 2	Halmstads BK (1)	4–0	Örgryte IS (2)	Halmstad
16:00	Mathisen 26'; Tveter 63', 77'; Olsson 82'	Report		Stadium: Skedalahed; Attendance: 653; Referee: Per Melin

4 March 2017 Matchday 3	Örgryte IS (2)	1–3	Vänersborgs FK (4)	Gothenburg
14:00	Gashi 10'; Fonjah 29'; Palumbo 90'	Report	Skogh 71'	Stadium: Valhalla IP; Attendance: 509; Referee: Fredrik Klitte

4 March 2017 Matchday 3	IFK Norrköping (1)	7–0	Halmstads BK (1)	Norrköping
14:00	Holmberg 5', 11', 29'; Andersson 13', 67'; Moberg Karlsson 22'; Bärkroth 73'	Report		Stadium: Östgötaporten; Attendance: 1,861; Referee: Glenn Nyberg

=== Group 3 ===
Pos	Team	Pld	W	D	L	GF	GA	GD	Pts	Qualification	IFKG	IKS	LSK	ASIF
1	IFK Göteborg	3	2	1	0	11	4	+7	7	Advance to Knockout stage	—	2–2	3–2	—
2	IK Sirius	3	2	1	0	9	2	+7	7		—	—	2–0	—
3	Ljungskile SK	3	1	0	2	4	5	−1	3		—	—	—	2–0
4	Arameiska-Syrianska IF	3	0	0	3	0	13	−13	0		0–6	0–5	—	—

Source: Swedish Football Association
Rules for classification: 1) Points; 2) Goal difference; 3) Goals scored; 4) Head-to-head record; 5) Highest ranked team

18 February 2017 Matchday 1	IFK Göteborg (1)	3–2	Ljungskile SK (3)	Gothenburg
16:00	Rieks 7'; Ómarsson 35'; Rogne 38'	Report	Strömberg 50'; Gustafsson 56'	Stadium: Bravida Arena; Attendance: 2,221; Referee: Robert Daradic

19 February 2017 Matchday 1	Arameisk-Syrianska IF (3)	0–5	IK Sirius FK (1)	Södertälje
16:00		Report	Nilsson 17'; Sarfo 43'; Vecchia 58'; Kapcevic 60'; Montiel 89'	Stadium: Södertälje Fotbollsarena; Attendance: 193; Referee: Jim Petersson

25 February 2017 Matchday 2	IK Sirius FK (1)	2–0	Ljungskile SK (3)	Uppsala
14:00	Vecchia 31'; Sarfo 55'	Report		Stadium: Lötens IP; Attendance: 824; Referee: Glenn Nyberg

26 February 2017 Matchday 2	IFK Göteborg (1)	6–0	Arameisk-Syrianska IF (3)	Gothenburg
16:00	Boman 7'; Rieks 26', 36', 48'; Salomonsson 83'; Boo Wiklander 86'	Report		Stadium: Bravida Arena; Attendance: 1,281; Referee: Kaspar Sjöberg

4 March 2017 Matchday 3	Ljungskile SK (3)	2–0	Arameisk-Syrianska IF (3)	Uddevalla
16:00	Wallin 80'; Filipović 90'	Report		Stadium: Uddevalla Arena; Attendance: 150; Referee: Granit Maqedonci

4 March 2017 Matchday 3	IFK Göteborg (1)	2–2	IK Sirius FK (1)	Gothenburg
16:00	Boman 2'; Rogne 61'	Report	Bergman 73', 85'	Stadium: Bravida Arena; Attendance: 2,411; Referee: Stefan Johannesson

=== Group 4 ===
Pos	Team	Pld	W	D	L	GF	GA	GD	Pts	Qualification	IFE	IFKV	FFF	YIK
1	IF Elfsborg	3	2	1	0	11	3	+8	7	Advance to Knockout stage	—	2–2	6–1	—
2	IFK Värnamo	3	1	2	0	4	3	+1	5		—	—	—	1–0
3	Falkenbergs FF	3	1	1	1	5	7	−2	4		—	1–1	—	—
4	Ytterhogdals IK	3	0	0	3	0	7	−7	0		0–3	—	0–3	—

Source: Swedish Football Association
Rules for classification: 1) Points; 2) Goal difference; 3) Goals scored; 4) Head-to-head record; 5) Highest ranked team

18 February 2017 Matchday 1	Ytterhogdals IK (5)	0–3	Falkenbergs FF (2)	Ljusdal
16:00		Report	Rodevåg 47'; Pärsson 65'; Lassagård 88'	Stadium: Fotbollshallen, Ljusdal; Attendance: 267; Referee: Martin Strömbergsson

19 February 2017 Matchday 1	IF Elfsborg (1)	2–2	IFK Värnamo (2)	Borås
16:00	Gustavsson 25'; Lundevall 67'	Report	Lundgren 52'; Cederqvist 54'	Stadium: Borås Arena; Attendance: 1,100; Referee: Magnus Lindgren

25 February 2017 Matchday 2	Falkenbergs FF (2)	1–1	IFK Värnamo (2)	Falkenberg
14:00	Pärsson 60' (pen.)	Report	Cederqvist 43'	Stadium: Kristineslätts IP; Attendance: 327; Referee: Granit Maqedonci

26 February 2017 Matchday 2	Ytterhogdals IK (5)	0–3	IF Elfsborg (1)	Ljusdal
14:00		Report	Gustavsson 41', 51'; Prodell 75'	Stadium: Fotbollshallen, Ljusdal; Attendance: 667; Referee: Patrik Eriksson

5 March 2017 Matchday 3	IFK Värnamo (2)	1–0	Ytterhogdals IK (5)	Värnamo
14:00	Culum 69'	Report		Stadium: Ljusseveka; Attendance: 132; Referee: Jonas Karlsson

5 March 2017 Matchday 3	IF Elfsborg (1)	6–1	Falkenbergs FF (2)	Borås
14:00	Frick 7'; Jönsson 35'; Lundevall 66'; Randrup 72'; Gustavsson 87'; Kabashi 88'	Report	Pärsson 58' (pen.)	Stadium: Borås Arena; Attendance: 861; Referee: Kaspar Sjöberg

=== Group 5 ===
Pos	Team	Pld	W	D	L	GF	GA	GD	Pts	Qualification	TFF	KFF	LAN	GIF
1	Trelleborgs FF	3	2	1	0	5	3	+2	7	Advance to Knockout stage	—	—	2–1	—
2	Kalmar FF	3	1	2	0	6	3	+3	5		2–1	—	—	3–0
3	Landskrona BoIS	3	1	1	1	5	5	0	4		—	2–2	—	2–1
4	Gefle IF	3	0	0	3	2	7	−5	0		1–2	—	—	—

Source: Swedish Football Association
Rules for classification: 1) Points; 2) Goal difference; 3) Goals scored; 4) Head-to-head record; 5) Highest ranked team

19 February 2017 Matchday 1	Kalmar FF (1)	1–1	Trelleborgs FF (2)	Kalmar
14:00	D. Elm 86'	Report	Håkansson 77'	Stadium: Gasten IP; Attendance: 844; Referee: Kaspar Sjöberg

19 February 2017 Matchday 1	Landskrona BoIS (3)	2–1	Gefle IF (2)	Landskrona
14:00	Zahui 31'; Nalić 84'	Report	Oremo 90+3'	Stadium: Landskrona IP; Attendance: 311; Referee: Per Melin

26 February 2017 Matchday 2	Gefle IF (2)	1–2	Trelleborgs FF (2)	Gävle
13:00	Ljungberg 41'	Report	Camara-Jönsson 43'; Brannefalk 56'	Stadium: Gavlevallen; Attendance: 150; Referee: Victor Wolf

26 February 2017 Matchday 2	Landskrona BoIS (3)	2–2	Kalmar FF (1)	Landskrona
14:00	Karim 11'; Nalić 71'	Report	Sachpekidis 31'; D. Elm 90'	Stadium: Landskrona IP; Attendance: 700; Referee: Fredrik Klitte

4 March 2017 Matchday 3	Trelleborgs FF (2)	2–1	Landskrona BoIS (3)	Trelleborg
16:00	Camara-Jönsson 74', 86'	Report	Zahui 3'	Stadium: Vångavallen; Attendance: 988; Referee: Magnus Lindgren

4 March 2017 Matchday 3	Kalmar FF (1)	3–0	Gefle IF (2)	Kalmar
16:00	V. Elm 5'; Thorbjörnsson 74'; Diouf 85'	Report		Stadium: Gasten IP; Attendance: 344; Referee: Andreas Ekberg

=== Group 6 ===
Pos	Team	Pld	W	D	L	GF	GA	GD	Pts	Qualification	IFB	DEIF	DIF	HIF
1	IF Brommapojkarna	3	2	1	0	8	2	+6	7	Advance to Knockout stage	—	—	1–1	3–0
2	Degerfors IF	3	2	0	1	6	7	−1	6		1–4	—	—	—
3	Djurgårdens IF	3	1	1	1	3	3	0	4		—	1–2	—	1–0
4	Helsingborgs IF	3	0	0	3	2	7	−5	0		—	2–3	—	—

Source: Swedish Football Association
Rules for classification: 1) Points; 2) Goal difference; 3) Goals scored; 4) Head-to-head record; 5) Highest ranked team

18 February 2017 Matchday 1	IF Brommapojkarna (2)	3–0	Helsingborgs IF (2)	Stockholm
16:00	Brandeborn 8'; Kabran 49'; Sandberg Magnusson 55'	Report		Stadium: Grimsta IP; Attendance: 124; Referee: Stefan Johannesson

20 February 2017 Matchday 1	Djurgårdens IF (1)	1–2	Degerfors IF (2)	Stockholm
19:00	Jawo 62'	Report	Hasani 1', 70'	Stadium: Tele2 Arena; Attendance: 7,000; Referee: Mohammed Al-Hakim

26 February 2017 Matchday 2	Helsingborgs IF (2)	2–3	Degerfors IF (2)	Helsingborg
14:00	Monday 46', 70'	Report	Abraham 9' de Bruin 33'; Andersson 48'	Stadium: Olympiafältet; Attendance: 1,178; Referee: Magnus Lindgren

27 February 2017 Matchday 2	IF Brommapojkarna (2)	1–1	Djurgårdens IF (1)	Stockholm
19:00	Gerbino Polo 41'	Report	Mrabti 54'	Stadium: Tele2 Arena; Attendance: 2,531; Referee: Johan Hamlin

4 March 2017 Matchday 3	Djurgårdens IF (1)	1–0	Helsingborgs IF (2)	Stockholm
14:00	El Kabir 75' (pen.)	Report		Stadium: Tele2 Arena; Attendance: 4,024; Referee: Markus Strömbergsson

4 March 2017 Matchday 3	Degerfors IF (2)	1–4	IF Brommapojkarna (2)	Degerfors
14:00	Haidar 69'	Report	Gerbino Polo 70', 90+4'; Brandeborn 85'; Gyökeres 89'	Stadium: Stora Valla; Attendance: 541; Referee: Victor Wolf

=== Group 7 ===
Pos	Team	Pld	W	D	L	GF	GA	GD	Pts	Qualification	ÖFK	HAM	VAR	NBIS
1	Östersunds FK	3	3	0	0	8	2	+6	9	Advance to Knockout stage	—	1–0	2–1	—
2	Hammarby IF	3	1	1	1	6	6	0	4		—	—	3–3	—
3	Varbergs BoIS	3	0	2	1	5	6	−1	2		—	—	—	1–1
4	Nyköpings BIS	3	0	1	2	4	9	−5	1		1–5	2–3	—	—

Source: Swedish Football Association
Rules for classification: 1) Points; 2) Goal difference; 3) Goals scored; 4) Head-to-head record; 5) Highest ranked team

18 February 2017 Matchday 1	Nyköpings BIS (3)	2–3	Hammarby IF (1)	Nyköping
14:00	Funes 45+1'; Ahmetović 72'	Report	Dibba 14'; Bakircioglu 17' (pen.); Hamad 38'	Stadium: Rosvalla IP; Attendance: 2,800; Referee: Nerman Cisic

18 February 2017 Matchday 1	Östersunds FK (1)	2–1	Varbergs BoIS (2)	Östersund
14:00	Ghoddos 18', 90+4'	Report	Palmquist 69'	Stadium: Jämtkraft Arena; Attendance: 1,300; Referee: Patrik Eriksson

25 February 2017 Matchday 2	Nyköpings BIS (3)	1–5	Östersunds FK (1)	Nyköping
16:00	Björk 52'	Report	Sema 4'; Bertilsson 24', 63'; Aiesh 50', 66'	Stadium: Rosvalla IP; Attendance: 355; Referee: Farouk Nehdi

26 February 2017 Matchday 2	Hammarby IF (1)	3–3	Varbergs BoIS (2)	Stockholm
16:00	Sævarsson 12'; Hamad 26'; Dibba 90+4'	Report	Altemark-Vanneryr 5'; Söderström 10', 70'	Stadium: Tele2 Arena; Attendance: 6,700; Referee: Mohammed Al-Hakim

5 March 2017 Matchday 3	Varbergs BoIS (2)	1–1	Nyköpings BIS (2)	Varberg
14:00	Söderström 48'	Report	Kouakou 44'	Stadium: Påskbergsvallen; Attendance: 154; Referee: Kristoffer Karlsson

5 March 2017 Matchday 3	Östersunds FK (1)	1–0	Hammarby IF (1)	Östersund
14:00	Aiesh 5'	Report		Stadium: Jämtkraft Arena; Attendance: 1,516; Referee: Bojan Pandzic

=== Group 8 ===
Pos	Team	Pld	W	D	L	GF	GA	GD	Pts	Qualification	BKH	ÖSK	ÅFF	BKVN
1	BK Häcken	3	2	1	0	8	2	+6	7	Advance to Knockout stage	—	—	3–1	—
2	Örebro SK	3	1	2	0	7	2	+5	5		1–1	—	1–1	—
3	Åtvidabergs FF	3	1	1	1	8	4	+4	4		—	—	—	6–0
4	BKV Norrtälje	3	0	0	3	0	15	−15	0		0–4	0–5	—	—

Source: Swedish Football Association
Rules for classification: 1) Points; 2) Goal difference; 3) Goals scored; 4) Head-to-head record; 5) Highest ranked team

18 February 2017 Matchday 1	BKV Norrtälje (4)	0–4	BK Häcken (1)	Norrtälje
14:00		Report	Sudić 19'; Kamara 48', 57'; Andersson 63'	Stadium: Norrtälje Sportcentrum; Attendance: 606; Referee: Farouk Nehdi

18 February 2017 Matchday 1	Örebro SK (1)	1–1	Åtvidabergs FF (2)	Örebro
14:00	Besara 45+3' (pen.)	Report	Holm 90'	Stadium: Behrn Arena; Attendance: 913; Referee: Glenn Nyberg

25 February 2017 Matchday 2	BK Häcken (1)	3–1	Åtvidabergs FF (2)	Gothenburg
14:00	Kamara 5'; Jacobsson 55' (o.g.); Mohammed 70'	Report	Bellander 42'	Stadium: Bravida Arena; Attendance: 448; Referee: Kristoffer Karlsson

25 February 2017 Matchday 2	BKV Norrtälje (4)	0–5	Örebro SK (1)	Norrtälje
14:00		Report	Lorentzson 15'; Sköld 60'; Ayaz 62', 73'; Mårtensson 66'	Stadium: Norrtälje Sportcentrum; Attendance: 414; Referee: Antti Kanerva

5 March 2017 Matchday 3	Örebro SK (1)	1–1	BK Häcken (1)	Örebro
16:00	Gerzić 8'	Report	Wahlström 29'	Stadium: Behrn Arena; Attendance: 1,297; Referee: Johan Hamlin

5 March 2017 Matchday 3	Åtvidabergs FF (2)	6–0	BKV Norrtälje (4)	Åtvidaberg
16:00	Birkfeldt 8', 84'; Cosić 15', 90+1'; Lagerblom 26'; Helg 72'	Report		Stadium: Kopparvallen; Attendance: 161; Referee: Johan Krantz

== Knockout stage ==
=== Qualified teams ===
Pos	Grp	Team	Pld	W	D	L	GF	GA	GD	Pts	Qualification
1	7	Östersunds FK	3	3	0	0	8	2	+6	9	Seeded in Quarter-final draw
2	4	IF Elfsborg	3	2	1	0	11	3	+8	7	Seeded in Quarter-final draw
3	3	IFK Göteborg	3	2	1	0	11	4	+7	7	Seeded in Quarter-final draw
4	8	BK Häcken	3	2	1	0	8	2	+6	7	Seeded in Quarter-final draw
5	6	IF Brommapojkarna	3	2	1	0	8	2	+6	7	Unseeded in Quarter-final draw
6	1	AIK	3	2	1	0	4	0	+4	7	Unseeded in Quarter-final draw
7	5	Trelleborgs FF	3	2	1	0	5	3	+2	7	Unseeded in Quarter-final draw
8	2	IFK Norrköping	3	1	2	0	10	3	+7	5	Unseeded in Quarter-final draw

Source: Group results
Rules for classification: 1) Points; 2) Goal difference; 3) Goals scored; 4) Ranking in 2016 season

=== Bracket ===
Quarter-finals
12 March – Gothenburg
BK Häcken	3
AIK	0
11 March – Östersund
Östersunds FK	4
Trelleborgs FF	1
11 March – Gothenburg
IFK Göteborg	1
IFK Norrköping	2
12 March – Borås
IF Elfsborg	1
IF Brommapojkarna	2

Semi-finals
18 March – Gothenburg
BK Häcken	1
Östersunds FK	3
19 March – Norrköping
IFK Norrköping	4
IF Brommapojkarna	0

Final
13 April – Östersund
Östersunds FK	4
IFK Norrköping	1

=== Quarter-finals ===
The quarter-finals consists of the eight teams that won their respective group in the previous round. The four best group winners were seeded and drawn against the other four group winners, with the seeded teams entitled to play the match at their home venue. IF Brommapojkarna and Trelleborgs FF are the lowest ranked teams in the quarter-finals as they will play in the second tier, Superettan, for the 2017 season, while the other teams will play in the top tier, Allsvenskan.

The draw for the quarter-finals and semi-finals was held on 5 March 2017. and the quarter-final matches will be played on 11 and 12 March 2017.

11 March 2017	Östersunds FK (1)	4–1	Trelleborgs FF (2)	Östersund
16:00	Bertilsson 7'; Nouri 27' (pen.); Ghoddos 48'; Bojanić 90+2'	Report	Islamović 87'	Stadium: Jämtkraft Arena; Attendance: 1,520; Referee: Kristoffer Karlsson

11 March 2017	IFK Göteborg (1)	1–2	IFK Norrköping (1)	Gothenburg
18:30	Boman 80'	Report	Holmberg 57', 68'	Stadium: Ullevi; Attendance: 2,470; Referee: Mohammed Al-Hakim

12 March 2017	IF Elfsborg (1)	1–2	IF Brommapojkarna (2)	Borås
16:00	Jebali 10'	Report	Kabran 2'; Gyökeres 83'	Stadium: Borås Arena; Attendance: 1,425; Referee: Johan Hamlin

12 March 2017	BK Häcken (1)	3–0	AIK (1)	Gothenburg
18:30	Lindgren 70'; Kamara 89'; Paulinho 90+4' (pen.)	Report		Stadium: Bravida Arena; Attendance: 1,764; Referee: Stefan Johannesson

=== Semi-finals ===
The semi-finals consist of the four winners from the quarter-finals. The draw was a free draw and the first drawn team in each pairing will play the match at their home venue.

The matches will be played on 18 and 19 March 2017.

18 March 2017	BK Häcken (1)	1–3	Östersunds FK (1)	Gothenburg
18:30	Kamara 32'	Report	Pettersson 6'; Ghoddos 30', 87'	Stadium: Bravida Arena; Attendance: 1,632; Referee: Andreas Ekberg

19 March 2017	IFK Norrköping (1)	4–0	IF Brommapojkarna (2)	Norrköping
18:30	Fjóluson 20'; Holmberg 29', 66'; Eliasson 64'	Report		Stadium: Östgötaporten; Attendance: 2,895; Referee: Bojan Pandzic

=== Final ===
13 April 2017
16:00

Östersunds FK (1)	4–1	IFK Norrköping (1)
Mensah 8'; Aiesh 18'; Gero 83'; Ghoddos 86'	Report	Wahlqvist 54'

Jämtkraft Arena, Östersund
Attendance: 8,369
Referee: Mohammed Al-Hakim (Västerås)
