= List of Swedish football transfers summer 2015 =

This is a list of Swedish football transfers in the summer transfer window 2015 by club.

Only transfers in and out between 15 July – 11 August 2015 of the Allsvenskan and Superettan are included.

== Allsvenskan ==
=== AIK ===
In: Note: Flags indicate national team as defined under FIFA eligibility rules; some limited exceptions apply. Players may hold more than one non-FIFA nationality.

No.	Pos.	Nation	Player
21	MF	SWE	William Sheriff (promoted)
24	MF	SWE	Stefan Ishizaki (free agent)
26	DF	NED	Jos Hooiveld (free agent)
32	DF	GHA	Patrick Kpozo (from Inter Allies)

Out: Note: Flags indicate national team as defined under FIFA eligibility rules; some limited exceptions apply. Players may hold more than one non-FIFA nationality.

No.	Pos.	Nation	Player
2	DF	FIN	Sauli Väisänen (on loan to HIFK)
5	MF	SWE	Panajotis Dimitriadis (to Gençlerbirliği)
11	MF	SWE	Nabil Bahoui (to Al-Ahli (Jeddah))
25	MF	SWE	Sam Lundholm (to NEC)

=== BK Häcken ===
In: Note: Flags indicate national team as defined under FIFA eligibility rules; some limited exceptions apply. Players may hold more than one non-FIFA nationality.

No.	Pos.	Nation	Player
4	DF	RSA	Tefu Mashamaite (from Kaizer Chiefs)
7	MF	NED	Niels Vorthoren (from Maastricht)
11	FW	BRA	Paulinho (from Piracicaba)
16	MF	SWE	Joakim Olausson (from Atalanta)
31	FW	NED	Michiel Hemmen (from Cambuur)
—	MF	FIN	Rasmus Schüller (from HJK)
—	MF	SWE	Albin Skoglund (promoted)

Out: Note: Flags indicate national team as defined under FIFA eligibility rules; some limited exceptions apply. Players may hold more than one non-FIFA nationality.

No.	Pos.	Nation	Player
4	DF	ETH	Walid Atta (to Gençlerbirliği)
7	MF	SWE	Simon Gustafson (to Feyenoord)
11	MF	ISL	Gunnar Heiðar Þorvaldsson (to ÍBV)
19	DF	MKD	Leonard Zuta (to Rijeka)

=== Djurgårdens IF ===
In: Note: Flags indicate national team as defined under FIFA eligibility rules; some limited exceptions apply. Players may hold more than one non-FIFA nationality.

No.	Pos.	Nation	Player
7	MF	KOR	Moon Seon-min (on loan from Östersunds FK)
24	FW	ZIM	Tino Kadewere (on loan from Harare City)

Out: Note: Flags indicate national team as defined under FIFA eligibility rules; some limited exceptions apply. Players may hold more than one non-FIFA nationality.

No.	Pos.	Nation	Player
7	MF	SWE	Martin Broberg (to Örebro SK)
21	FW	ZIM	Nyasha Mushekwi (loan return to Mamelodi Sundowns)

=== Falkenbergs FF ===
In: Note: Flags indicate national team as defined under FIFA eligibility rules; some limited exceptions apply. Players may hold more than one non-FIFA nationality.

No.	Pos.	Nation	Player

Out: Note: Flags indicate national team as defined under FIFA eligibility rules; some limited exceptions apply. Players may hold more than one non-FIFA nationality.

No.	Pos.	Nation	Player
3	MF	SWE	Hampus Svensson (on loan to Vinberg)

=== Gefle IF ===
In: Note: Flags indicate national team as defined under FIFA eligibility rules; some limited exceptions apply. Players may hold more than one non-FIFA nationality.

No.	Pos.	Nation	Player
21	MF	GHA	Kwame Bonsu (from Mjällby)
25	GK	MNE	Zoran Aković (on loan from Husqvarna)

Out: Note: Flags indicate national team as defined under FIFA eligibility rules; some limited exceptions apply. Players may hold more than one non-FIFA nationality.

No.	Pos.	Nation	Player
20	FW	SWE	Emil Bellander (on loan to Brommapojkarna)
21	MF	SWE	Oscar Karlsson (released)

=== GIF Sundsvall ===
In: Note: Flags indicate national team as defined under FIFA eligibility rules; some limited exceptions apply. Players may hold more than one non-FIFA nationality.

No.	Pos.	Nation	Player
12	FW	KOS	Shpëtim Hasani (from Górnik Łęczna)
25	DF	SWE	Robert Hammerstedt (from Östersund)

Out: Note: Flags indicate national team as defined under FIFA eligibility rules; some limited exceptions apply. Players may hold more than one non-FIFA nationality.

No.	Pos.	Nation	Player
2	DF	SWE	Joakim Nilsson (to NEC)
20	MF	SWE	Smajl Suljević (on loan to Frej)
—	DF	SWE	Robert Lundström (to Vålerenga)

=== Halmstads BK ===
In: Note: Flags indicate national team as defined under FIFA eligibility rules; some limited exceptions apply. Players may hold more than one non-FIFA nationality.

No.	Pos.	Nation	Player
14	MF	SWE	Alexander Henningsson (from Öster)
21	MF	ZIM	Matthew Rusike (from Kaizer Chiefs)

Out: Note: Flags indicate national team as defined under FIFA eligibility rules; some limited exceptions apply. Players may hold more than one non-FIFA nationality.

No.	Pos.	Nation	Player
—	GK	SWE	Tim Erlandsson (to Nottingham Forest)
—	DF	SWE	Joseph Baffo (to Eintracht Braunschweig)

=== Hammarby IF ===
In: Note: Flags indicate national team as defined under FIFA eligibility rules; some limited exceptions apply. Players may hold more than one non-FIFA nationality.

No.	Pos.	Nation	Player
1	GK	ISL	Ögmundur Kristinsson (from Randers)
3	DF	SWE	Richard Magyar (from Aarau)
7	FW	SWE	Jakob Orlov (on loan from Brann)
55	FW	SWE	Imad Khalili (from Baniyas)

Out: Note: Flags indicate national team as defined under FIFA eligibility rules; some limited exceptions apply. Players may hold more than one non-FIFA nationality.

No.	Pos.	Nation	Player
1	GK	SWE	Johannes Hopf (to Gençlerbirliği)
3	DF	DEN	Thomas Guldborg Christensen (to Valur)
6	DF	BIH	Marko Mihajlović (released)
7	MF	SWE	Nahir Besara (to Göztepe)
15	MF	SWE	Viktor Nordin (on loan to Frej)
20	MF	LBR	Amadaiya Rennie (on loan to Brann)

=== Helsingborgs IF ===
In: Note: Flags indicate national team as defined under FIFA eligibility rules; some limited exceptions apply. Players may hold more than one non-FIFA nationality.

No.	Pos.	Nation	Player
22	FW	SWE	Rade Prica (from Maccabi Tel Aviv)

Out: Note: Flags indicate national team as defined under FIFA eligibility rules; some limited exceptions apply. Players may hold more than one non-FIFA nationality.

No.	Pos.	Nation	Player
21	FW	LBN	Mohamed Ramadan (on loan to Landskrona BoIS)
24	FW	SWE	Anton Kinnander (on loan to Motala) (Note: "Unknown".)
32	DF	SWE	Gustav Jarl (on loan to AFC United)
—	DF	SWE	Emil Krafth (to Bologna)
—	MF	ISL	Victor Pálsson (to Esbjerg)

=== IF Elfsborg ===
In: Note: Flags indicate national team as defined under FIFA eligibility rules; some limited exceptions apply. Players may hold more than one non-FIFA nationality.

No.	Pos.	Nation	Player
4	MF	SWE	Rasmus Rosenqvist (promoted)
25	DF	NOR	Niklas Gunnarsson (on loan from Vålerenga)

Out: Note: Flags indicate national team as defined under FIFA eligibility rules; some limited exceptions apply. Players may hold more than one non-FIFA nationality.

No.	Pos.	Nation	Player

=== IFK Göteborg ===
In: Note: Flags indicate national team as defined under FIFA eligibility rules; some limited exceptions apply. Players may hold more than one non-FIFA nationality.

No.	Pos.	Nation	Player
6	MF	SWE	Sebastian Eriksson (from Cagliari)
7	MF	DEN	Mads Albæk (from Reims)
10	FW	FIN	Riku Riski (on loan from Rosenborg) (Note: "Nyheter | Rosenborg".)
17	MF	GHA	Prosper Kasim (from International Allies) (Note: "IFK - Två nyförvärv från Ghana".)
18	MF	GHA	Lawson Sabah (from International Allies)
20	FW	SWE	Victor Sköld (from Åtvidaberg)
21	FW	SEN	Malick Mané (loan return from Hønefoss)

Out: Note: Flags indicate national team as defined under FIFA eligibility rules; some limited exceptions apply. Players may hold more than one non-FIFA nationality.

No.	Pos.	Nation	Player
3	DF	USA	Heath Pearce (released)
6	MF	SWE	Sebastian Eriksson (loan return to Cagliari)
15	FW	DEN	Thomas Mikkelsen (loan return to OB)
21	FW	SEN	Malick Mané (on loan to Najran)
23	DF	SWE	Patrick Dyrestam (on loan to Utsikten)
26	MF	SWE	Karl Bohm (on loan to Utsikten)
29	FW	DEN	Lasse Vibe (to Brentford)

=== IFK Norrköping ===
In: Note: Flags indicate national team as defined under FIFA eligibility rules; some limited exceptions apply. Players may hold more than one non-FIFA nationality.

No.	Pos.	Nation	Player
17	FW	SLE	Alhaji Kamara (loan return from Johor Darul Takzim)
—	MF	SWE	Marwan Bazi (promoted)

Out: Note: Flags indicate national team as defined under FIFA eligibility rules; some limited exceptions apply. Players may hold more than one non-FIFA nationality.

No.	Pos.	Nation	Player
19	MF	SWE	Mirza Halvadžić (on loan to Trelleborg)
22	DF	CRC	Christopher Meneses (released)
29	GK	SWE	Marcus Sahlman (released)

=== Kalmar FF ===
In: Note: Flags indicate national team as defined under FIFA eligibility rules; some limited exceptions apply. Players may hold more than one non-FIFA nationality.

No.	Pos.	Nation	Player
23	MF	SWE	Viktor Elm (from AZ)

Out: Note: Flags indicate national team as defined under FIFA eligibility rules; some limited exceptions apply. Players may hold more than one non-FIFA nationality.

No.	Pos.	Nation	Player
18	MF	NOR	Tor Øyvind Hovda (on loan to Åtvidaberg)
31	DF	SWE	Sebastian Ramhorn (on loan to Åtvidaberg)
—	FW	SWE	Pär Ericsson (on loan to Örebro)

=== Malmö FF ===
In: Note: Flags indicate national team as defined under FIFA eligibility rules; some limited exceptions apply. Players may hold more than one non-FIFA nationality.

No.	Pos.	Nation	Player
1	GK	SWE	Johan Wiland (from Copenhagen)
16	GK	SWE	Sixten Mohlin (loan return from Västerås)
18	MF	SWE	Petar Petrović (loan return from Värnamo)
20	DF	SRB	Vladimir Rodić (from Rad)
21	MF	ISL	Kári Árnason (from Rotherham United)
24	DF	TUR	Mahmut Özen (loan return from Kayseri Erciyesspor)
25	DF	URU	Felipe Carvalho (from Tacuarembó)
28	FW	SRB	Nikola Đurđić (on loan from Augsburg)
29	GK	SWE	Fredrik Andersson (from Örgryte)
32	MF	SWE	Mattias Svanberg (promoted)

Out: Note: Flags indicate national team as defined under FIFA eligibility rules; some limited exceptions apply. Players may hold more than one non-FIFA nationality.

No.	Pos.	Nation	Player
4	DF	SWE	Filip Helander (to Hellas Verona)
16	GK	SWE	Sixten Mohlin (on loan to Kristianstad)
21	DF	SWE	Erik Johansson (to Gent)
25	GK	SWE	Robin Olsen (to PAOK)

=== Åtvidabergs FF ===
In: Note: Flags indicate national team as defined under FIFA eligibility rules; some limited exceptions apply. Players may hold more than one non-FIFA nationality.

No.	Pos.	Nation	Player
9	FW	SWE	Ajsel Kujović (from Varbergs BoIS)
18	MF	NOR	Tor Øyvind Hovda (on loan from Kalmar)
28	DF	SWE	Sebastian Ramhorn (on loan from Kalmar)

Out: Note: Flags indicate national team as defined under FIFA eligibility rules; some limited exceptions apply. Players may hold more than one non-FIFA nationality.

No.	Pos.	Nation	Player
—	FW	SWE	Victor Sköld (to Göteborg)

=== Örebro SK ===
In: Note: Flags indicate national team as defined under FIFA eligibility rules; some limited exceptions apply. Players may hold more than one non-FIFA nationality.

No.	Pos.	Nation	Player
8	MF	SWE	Astrit Ajdarević (from Standard Liège)
9	MF	SWE	Martin Broberg (from Djurgårdens IF)
18	FW	SWE	Pär Ericsson (on loan from Kalmar)
—	FW	FRA	Mozart Surville (from Örebro Syrianska)

Out: Note: Flags indicate national team as defined under FIFA eligibility rules; some limited exceptions apply. Players may hold more than one non-FIFA nationality.

No.	Pos.	Nation	Player
7	FW	JAM	Michael Seaton (loan return to D.C. United)
99	DF	SWE	Anton Westerlund (to BK Forward)
—	FW	FRA	Mozart Surville (on loan to BK Forward)

== Superettan ==
=== AFC United ===
In: Note: Flags indicate national team as defined under FIFA eligibility rules; some limited exceptions apply. Players may hold more than one non-FIFA nationality.

No.	Pos.	Nation	Player
2	MF	PLE	Imad Zatara (free agent)
4	DF	IRQ	Rebin Sulaka (from Syrianska)
12	MF	ETH	Yussuf Saleh (from Sirius)
19	FW	SLE	Mohammed Buya Turay (from Västerås)
26	DF	ENG	Korede Aiyegbusi (free agent)
—	DF	SWE	Gustav Jarl (on loan from Helsingborg)
—	DF	SWE	Bun-Dawda Sowe (promoted)

Out: Note: Flags indicate national team as defined under FIFA eligibility rules; some limited exceptions apply. Players may hold more than one non-FIFA nationality.

No.	Pos.	Nation	Player

=== Assyriska FF ===
In: Note: Flags indicate national team as defined under FIFA eligibility rules; some limited exceptions apply. Players may hold more than one non-FIFA nationality.

No.	Pos.	Nation	Player

Out: Note: Flags indicate national team as defined under FIFA eligibility rules; some limited exceptions apply. Players may hold more than one non-FIFA nationality.

No.	Pos.	Nation	Player
11	FW	BIH	Admir Aganović (released)

=== Degerfors IF ===
In: Note: Flags indicate national team as defined under FIFA eligibility rules; some limited exceptions apply. Players may hold more than one non-FIFA nationality.

No.	Pos.	Nation	Player
17	DF	SWE	Emil Johansson (from Sandnes Ulf)

Out: Note: Flags indicate national team as defined under FIFA eligibility rules; some limited exceptions apply. Players may hold more than one non-FIFA nationality.

No.	Pos.	Nation	Player

=== GAIS ===
In: Note: Flags indicate national team as defined under FIFA eligibility rules; some limited exceptions apply. Players may hold more than one non-FIFA nationality.

No.	Pos.	Nation	Player
13	DF	SWE	Alieu Bajaha (promoted)
16	DF	SWE	Sebastian Starke Hedlund (from Schalke 04)
25	DF	SWE	Danny Ervik (from Mjällby)
27	FW	BRA	Wagsley (free agent) (Note: Unknown)

Out: Note: Flags indicate national team as defined under FIFA eligibility rules; some limited exceptions apply. Players may hold more than one non-FIFA nationality.

No.	Pos.	Nation	Player
10	MF	SWE	Petrit Zhubi (to Nest-Sotra)
19	FW	SWE	Bryan Johansson (on loan to Lidköping)
29	DF	SWE	Tahir Kocak (on loan to Qviding)
31	FW	SWE	Shkelqim Krasniqi (on loan to Qviding)
35	GK	SWE	Oliver Gustafsson (on loan to Torslanda)

=== IF Brommapojkarna ===
In: Note: Flags indicate national team as defined under FIFA eligibility rules; some limited exceptions apply. Players may hold more than one non-FIFA nationality.

No.	Pos.	Nation	Player
11	MF	UGA	Martin Kayongo-Mutumba (from Rah Ahan)
17	FW	SRB	Nikola Grubjesic (from Dunaújváros)
27	FW	SWE	Emil Bellander (on loan from Gefle)
28	DF	DEN	Niclas Vemmelund (free agent)

Out: Note: Flags indicate national team as defined under FIFA eligibility rules; some limited exceptions apply. Players may hold more than one non-FIFA nationality.

No.	Pos.	Nation	Player
9	MF	SWE	Filip Tronêt (on loan to Västerås)
11	MF	PER	Alexi Gómez (to San Luis de Quillota)

=== IFK Värnamo ===
In: Note: Flags indicate national team as defined under FIFA eligibility rules; some limited exceptions apply. Players may hold more than one non-FIFA nationality.

No.	Pos.	Nation	Player

Out: Note: Flags indicate national team as defined under FIFA eligibility rules; some limited exceptions apply. Players may hold more than one non-FIFA nationality.

No.	Pos.	Nation	Player
24	MF	SWE	Petar Petrović (loan return to Malmö)

=== IK Frej ===
In: Note: Flags indicate national team as defined under FIFA eligibility rules; some limited exceptions apply. Players may hold more than one non-FIFA nationality.

No.	Pos.	Nation	Player
—	MF	SWE	Viktor Nordin (on loan from Hammarby)
—	MF	SWE	Smajl Suljević (on loan from GIF Sundsvall)

Out: Note: Flags indicate national team as defined under FIFA eligibility rules; some limited exceptions apply. Players may hold more than one non-FIFA nationality.

No.	Pos.	Nation	Player

=== IK Sirius ===
In: Note: Flags indicate national team as defined under FIFA eligibility rules; some limited exceptions apply. Players may hold more than one non-FIFA nationality.

No.	Pos.	Nation	Player

Out: Note: Flags indicate national team as defined under FIFA eligibility rules; some limited exceptions apply. Players may hold more than one non-FIFA nationality.

No.	Pos.	Nation	Player
—	MF	ETH	Yussuf Saleh (to AFC United)

=== Jönköping Södra IF ===
In: Note: Flags indicate national team as defined under FIFA eligibility rules; some limited exceptions apply. Players may hold more than one non-FIFA nationality.

No.	Pos.	Nation	Player

Out: Note: Flags indicate national team as defined under FIFA eligibility rules; some limited exceptions apply. Players may hold more than one non-FIFA nationality.

No.	Pos.	Nation	Player

=== Ljungskile SK ===
In: Note: Flags indicate national team as defined under FIFA eligibility rules; some limited exceptions apply. Players may hold more than one non-FIFA nationality.

No.	Pos.	Nation	Player
16	FW	NGA	Ahmed Abdultaofik (from Spartaks)

Out: Note: Flags indicate national team as defined under FIFA eligibility rules; some limited exceptions apply. Players may hold more than one non-FIFA nationality.

No.	Pos.	Nation	Player
19	FW	SWE	Admir Bajrovic (on loan to Follo)

=== Mjällby AIF ===
In: Note: Flags indicate national team as defined under FIFA eligibility rules; some limited exceptions apply. Players may hold more than one non-FIFA nationality.

No.	Pos.	Nation	Player
—	MF	NGA	Theophilus Ola (free agent)

Out: Note: Flags indicate national team as defined under FIFA eligibility rules; some limited exceptions apply. Players may hold more than one non-FIFA nationality.

No.	Pos.	Nation	Player
20	MF	GHA	Kwame Bonsu (to Gefle)
29	DF	SWE	Danny Ervik (to GAIS)

=== Syrianska FC ===
In: Note: Flags indicate national team as defined under FIFA eligibility rules; some limited exceptions apply. Players may hold more than one non-FIFA nationality.

No.	Pos.	Nation	Player

Out: Note: Flags indicate national team as defined under FIFA eligibility rules; some limited exceptions apply. Players may hold more than one non-FIFA nationality.

No.	Pos.	Nation	Player
—	DF	IRQ	Rebin Sulaka (to AFC United)

=== Utsiktens BK ===
In: Note: Flags indicate national team as defined under FIFA eligibility rules; some limited exceptions apply. Players may hold more than one non-FIFA nationality.

No.	Pos.	Nation	Player
24	MF	SWE	Karl Bohm (on loan from Göteborg)
—	DF	SWE	Patrick Dyrestam (on loan from Göteborg)

Out: Note: Flags indicate national team as defined under FIFA eligibility rules; some limited exceptions apply. Players may hold more than one non-FIFA nationality.

No.	Pos.	Nation	Player
11	FW	SWE	Mihael Jevtić (on loan to Mjølner)
24	MF	SWE	Jesper Olofsson (on loan to Frölunda)
94	DF	SWE	Mirza Mujčić (on loan to Mjølner)

=== Varbergs BoIS FC ===
In: Note: Flags indicate national team as defined under FIFA eligibility rules; some limited exceptions apply. Players may hold more than one non-FIFA nationality.

No.	Pos.	Nation	Player

Out: Note: Flags indicate national team as defined under FIFA eligibility rules; some limited exceptions apply. Players may hold more than one non-FIFA nationality.

No.	Pos.	Nation	Player
9	FW	SWE	Ajsel Kujović (to Åtvidaberg)
10	MF	SWE	Ardian Rexhepi (to Ängelholm) (Note: Unknown)

=== Ängelholms FF ===
In: Note: Flags indicate national team as defined under FIFA eligibility rules; some limited exceptions apply. Players may hold more than one non-FIFA nationality.

No.	Pos.	Nation	Player
—	MF	SWE	Ardian Rexhepi (from Varbergs BoIS)

Out: Note: Flags indicate national team as defined under FIFA eligibility rules; some limited exceptions apply. Players may hold more than one non-FIFA nationality.

No.	Pos.	Nation	Player

=== Östersunds FK ===
In: Note: Flags indicate national team as defined under FIFA eligibility rules; some limited exceptions apply. Players may hold more than one non-FIFA nationality.

No.	Pos.	Nation	Player
5	DF	SWE	Sotirios Papagiannopoulos (from PAOK)
11	FW	USA	Andrew Stadler (from Landskrona BoIS)

Out: Note: Flags indicate national team as defined under FIFA eligibility rules; some limited exceptions apply. Players may hold more than one non-FIFA nationality.

No.	Pos.	Nation	Player
12	FW	ENG	Taylor Morgan (on loan to Airdrieonians)
25	DF	SWE	Robert Hammerstedt (to GIF Sundsvall)
—	MF	KOR	Moon Seon-min (on loan to Djurgårdens IF)
