= 2017 BK Häcken season =

BK Häcken
- Full name: Bollklubben Häcken
- Nickname: Getingarna (The Wasps)
- Founded: 2 August 1940; 86 years ago
- Ground: Bravida Arena, Gothenburg
- Capacity: 6,500
- Chairman: Anders Billström
- Head coach: Mikael Stahre
- League: Allsvenskan
- 2017: TBA website = http://www.bkhacken.se/
Home colours	Away colours

BK Häcken will be competing in the following competitions during the 2017 campaign: Allsvenskan and Svenska Cupen

== Competitions ==
=== Club Friendlies ===
27 January 2017	(Denmark) AaB	1 - 0	(Sweden) BK Häcken
15:30		Report

4 February 2017	(Norway) Molde	2 - 3	(Sweden) BK Häcken
9:30		Report

10 February 2017	(Denmark) FC Midtjylland	1 - 2	(Sweden) BK Häcken
12:00		Report

25 March 2017	(Sweden) Trelleborg	0 - 0	(Sweden) BK Häcken
15:00		Report

27 June 2017	(Sweden) BK Häcken	1 - 2	(Denmark) AaB
17:00		Report

=== Allsvenskan ===
==== Results summary ====
Overall								Home						Away					
Pld	W	D	L	GF	GA	GD	Pts	W	D	L	GF	GA	GD	W	D	L	GF	GA	GD
30	14	10	6	42	28	+14	52	8	3	4	26	15	+11	6	7	2	16	13	+3

Last updated: 5 November 2017.

==== Results by matchday ====
Matchday	1	2	3	4	5	6	7	8	9	10	11	12	13	14	15	16	17	18	19	20	21	22	23	24	25	26	27	28	29	30
Ground	A	H	A	H	A	H	H	A	H	A	H	A	H	H	A	A	H	A	H	A	H	A	H	A	H	A	H	A	H	A
Result	D	D	W	L	D	W	D	W	W	D	L	L	W	L	W	D	D	W	W	D	W	W	W	L	L	D	W	D	W	W
Position	10	11	5	9	11	5	8	6	3	3	6	10	8	10	8	8	9	6	5	6	4	3	3	3	4	5	4	5	5	4

Updated to match(es) played on 5 November 2017. Source:
A = Away; H = Home; W = Win; D = Draw; L = Loss

== Matches ==
2 April 2017 Match 1	AIK	0 - 0	Häcken	Solna
15:00	Vrdoljak (yellow card) 47'	Report	Mohammed (yellow card) 9' (yellow-red card)	Stadium: Friends Arena; Attendance: 26,812; Referee: (Sweden) Andreas Ekberg

9 April 2017 Match 2	Häcken	0 - 0	Djurgårdens IF	Gothenburg
17:30	Lindgren (yellow card) 26'; Friberg (yellow card) 55'; Paulinho (yellow card) 55'	Report	Eriksson (yellow card) 24'; Kadewere (yellow card) 45+4'; El Kabir (yellow card) 64'; Walker (yellow card) 70'; Källström (yellow card) 89'	Stadium: Bravida Arena; Attendance: 5,541; Referee: (Sweden) Markus Strömbergsson

16 April 2017 Match 3	GIF Sundsvall	1 - 2	Häcken	Sundsvall
17:30	Danielsson (yellow card) 30'; Suljević (yellow card) 55'; Sigurðsson 58'	Report	Farnerud 21'; Binaku (yellow card) 23'; Alhassan Kamara 26' (yellow card) 27'; Abubakari (yellow card) 64'; Paulinho (yellow card) 80'	Stadium: Idrottsparken; Attendance: 3,055; Referee: (Sweden) Kristoffer Karlsson

== Svenska Cupen ==
23 August 2017 2nd Round	Kvibille BK	1 - 9	BK Häcken	Kvibille
18:00	Daniel Gunnarsson 33' (pen.); Victor Jarälv (yellow card) 41'	Report	Ranégie 3' (pen.) 71'; Andersson 5' 82'; Egbuchulam 16' (yellow card) 39' (goal) 51' 72'; Jakob Lindström (red card) 61'; Lindgren 73'; Lucas Hedlund 80'	Stadium: Björkevi; Attendance: 1,095; Referee: (Sweden) Kristoffer Karlsson
