= Marcus Rafferty =

Swedish footballer (born 2004)

Personal information
- Full name: Marcus Albin John Rafferty
- Date of birth: 1 October 2004 (age 22)
- Place of birth: Stockholm, Sweden
- Height: 1.80 m (5 ft 11 in)
- Positions: Attacking midfielder; central midfielder

Team information
- Current team: Kasımpaşa
- Number: 19

Youth career
- 2016–2019: Tullinge TP
- 2020–2023: Hammarby IF

Senior career*
Years	Team	Apps	(Gls)
2019	Tullinge TP	2	(0)
2023–2024	Hammarby IF	14	(0)
2023–2024	→ Hammarby TFF (res.)	11	(2)
2024	→ Aalesund (loan)	13	(7)
2025–2026	Degerfors IF	35	(9)
2026–	Kasımpaşa	7	(0)

International career^{‡}
2023	Sweden U19	2	(1)
2024–2026	Sweden U21	5	(1)
- * Club domestic league appearances and goals as of 18 October 2026 ‡ National team caps and goals as of 17:42, 1 April 2026 (UTC)

Marcus Albin John Rafferty (born 1 October 2004) is a Swedish footballer who plays as an attacking midfielder for Turkish Süper Lig club Kasımpaşa.

== Early life ==
Both his parents were active footballers. His Swedish mother Karolina Divert represented Hammarby IF's women's team in Damallsvenskan between 1988 and 1992, while his British father Nick Rafferty went on trial with Hammarby's men's team in 1994 but ultimately went on to play for Nacka FF in Sweden.

Rafferty was raised in Salem, south of Stockholm, and started to play youth football with local club Tullinge TP. In 2019, at age 15, he made two appearances for their senior team in Division 3, the domestic fifth tier.

In 2020, Rafferty joined the youth academy of Hammarby IF. In 2021, he suffered a broken foot and damaged foot ligaments, injuries that kept him sidelined for 20 months.

== Club career ==
On 3 July 2023, Rafferty made his debut for Hammarby in Allsvenskan, coming on as a substitute in a 0–2 away loss to IF Elfsborg. A couple of weeks later, on 15 July, he signed a new four-and-a-half-year contract with the club, running until the end of 2027.

On 17 December 2024, newly promoted Allsvenskan club Degerfors IF announced Rafferty as their new signing ahead of the 2025 season.

In the summer 2026, Rafferty joined Kasımpaşa in Turkey.

== International career ==
In 2019 and 2021, Rafferty was called up to the Swedish under-17s for two different training camps.

== Career statistics ==
=== Club ===
As of match played 12 October 2023

Club	Season	League			National Cup (Note: Includes Svenska Cupen)		Continental		Total	
Club	Season	Division	Apps	Goals	Apps	Goals	Apps	Goals	Apps	Goals
Tullinge TP	2019	Division 3	2	0	0	0	—		2	0
Tullinge TP	Total		2	0	0	0	0	0	2	0
Hammarby TFF	2023	Ettan	4	1	0	0	—		4	1
Hammarby TFF	Total		4	1	0	0	0	0	4	1
Hammarby IF	2023	Allsvenskan	13	0	1	1	2 (Note: Appearances in UEFA Europa Conference League)	0	16	1
Hammarby IF	2024	Allsvenskan	0	0	1	0	—		1	0
Hammarby IF	Total		13	0	2	1	2	0	17	1
Career total			19	1	2	1	2	0	23	1
