= Alexander Berntsson =

Swedish footballer

Personal information
- Full name: Erik Alexander Berntsson
- Date of birth: 30 March 1996 (age 30)
- Place of birth: Halmstad, Sweden
- Height: 1.93 m (6 ft 4 in)
- Position: Defender

Team information
- Current team: Selfoss

Youth career
- –2014: Halmstads BK

Senior career*
Years	Team	Apps	(Gls)
2014–2022	Halmstads BK	172	(5)
2023	Jönköpings Södra IF	27	(2)
2024	KÍ Klaksvík	12	(0)
2025–	Selfoss	13	(0)

International career
2014–2015	Sweden U19	2	(0)
- * Club domestic league appearances and goals as of 15 October 2025

Alexander Berntsson (born 30 March 1996) is a Swedish footballer who plays for Selfoss as a defender.

== Career statistics ==
As of match played 29 September 2024

Appearances and goals by club, season and competition
Club	Season	League			National Cup (Note: Includes Svenska Cupen, Faroe Islands Cup)		Continental		Other		Total	
Club	Season	Division	Apps	Goals	Apps	Goals	Apps	Goals	Apps	Goals	Apps	Goals
Halmstad	2014	Allsvenskan	1	0	0	0	—		—		1	0
Halmstad	2015	Allsvenskan	19	0	1	0	—		—		20	0
Halmstad	2016	Superettan	23	0	5	0	—		2 (Note: Appearance(s) in Promotion/Relegation play-offs)	0	30	0
Halmstad	2017	Allsvenskan	19	1	4	0	—		—		23	1
Halmstad	2018	Superettan	29	0	3	1	—		—		32	1
Halmstad	2019	Superettan	26	3	4	0	—		—		30	3
Halmstad	2020	Superettan	18	0	4	0	—		—		22	0
Halmstad	2021	Allsvenskan	11	0	1	0	—		1	0	13	0
Halmstad	2022	Superettan	22	1	1	0	—		—		23	1
Halmstad	Total		168	5	23	1	0	0	3	0	194	6
Jönköpings Södra IF	2023	Superettan	27	2	4	0	—		—		31	2
KÍ Klaksvík	2024	Faroe Islands Premier League	11	0	0	0	8 (Note: Four appearances, one goal in UEFA Champions League, Two appearances in UEFA Europa League, Two appearances in UEFA Europa Conference League)	1	0	0	19	1
Career total			206	7	27	1	8	1	3	0	244	9
