= Tullinge TP FK =

Swedish football club

- Full name: Tullinge Triangel Pojkar FK
- Founded: 1944
- Ground: Brantbrinks IP; Tullinge, Stockholm
- Chairman: Michele Di Dato
- Head coach: Noki Baic
- Coach: Stefan Jigell
- League: Swedish Football Division 4 Södra Svealand
- Division 4 Södra
Home colours	Away colours

Tullinge Triangel Pojkar FK, also known as Tullinge TP Football or Tullinge TP FK, is a Swedish football club based in Tullinge, Stockholm County. They are affiliated to the Stockholms Fotbollförbund and

== History ==
Tullinge TP FK was formed in 1944. The founders were three boys whose houses lay in a triangle relative to each other, hence the club's name, which translates as "Tullinge Triangle Boys".

In August 2016, Tullinge defeated FC Stockholm 4–3 in the semi-final of the Stockholm Cup, a result which qualified them for the 2017-18 Svenska Cupen. In the Stockholm Cup final, they lost 5–4 to IFK Haninge in front of 400 spectators.

Tullinge and Haninge met again in the first round of the Svenska Cupen, with Tullinge winning 4–3. In the second round, Tullinge lost 5–2 against Superettan team IK Frej.

== Stadium ==
The club's home venue is at Brantbrinks IP, a general sports ground located on the Flottilj road outside Tullinge. There the club has two full-size pitches with artificial grass, where all teams train and play their matches. The club also has their offices as well as a clubhouse with cafeteria, conference room and youth café and storage facilities.

== Current squad ==
As of 3 August 2017

Note: Flags indicate national team as defined under FIFA eligibility rules; some limited exceptions apply. Players may hold more than one non-FIFA nationality.

No.	Pos.	Nation	Player
1	GK	SWE	Mattias Forest
—	DF	SWE	Alexander Fransson
—	DF	SWE	Fredrik Åberg
—	DF	SWE	Kamyar Espahbodi
—	DF	SWE	Lukas Månsson
—	DF	SWE	Muhammad Kisa
—	DF	SWE	Simon Broman
—	MF	SWE	Go Wongta
14	MF	SWE	Jakob Freberg
—	MF	SWE	Oskar Idh-Talonen
—	MF	SWE	Srecko Baic

No.	Pos.	Nation	Player
—	MF	SWE	Teodor Bjurholm
—	MF	SWE	Önder Akbas
—	FW	SWE	Amro Al-dawoodi
—	FW	SWE	Cihan Gavgacioglu
—	FW	SWE	Emil Brunngård
—	FW	SWE	Felix Strindeby
—	FW	SWE	Frederik Varga
—	FW	SWE	Joel Isaksson Osmo
—	FW	SWE	Mikael Darreshourian
—	FW	SWE	Patrik Dalawe
