= Bjarni Duffield =

Icelandic footballer (born 1995)

Personal information
- Full name: Bjarni Mark Antonsson Duffield
- Date of birth: 27 December 1995 (age 30)
- Place of birth: Fjallabyggð, Iceland
- Height: 1.85 m (6 ft 1 in)
- Position: Midfielder

Team information
- Current team: Valur
- Number: 6

Youth career
- –2011: KF
- 2011–2014: KA

Senior career*
Years	Team	Apps	(Gls)
2014–2015	KA	2	(0)
2015	→ Fjarðabyggð (loan)	19	(2)
2016–2017	Kristianstad FC	38	(4)
2018	KA	22	(1)
2019–2021	IK Brage	57	(5)
2022–2023	Start	43	(4)
2024–	Valur	59	(3)

International career^{‡}
2020–	Iceland	3	(0)
- * Club domestic league appearances and goals as of 10 July 2026 ‡ National team caps and goals as of 18 March 2023

Bjarni Mark Antonsson Duffield (born 27 December 1995) is an Icelandic footballer who plays as a midfielder for Valur. The son of Mark Duffield, a footballer in the lower leagues of Iceland, Bjarni started his career at KA and at a young age moved to Norway to pay football. After spending close to a decade in Norway he moved to Icelandic giants Valur to plug a hole in the club's midfield.
