= Danny Ervik =

Swedish footballer

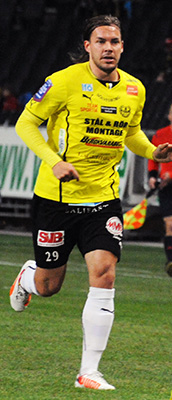

Personal information
- Date of birth: 24 February 1989 (age 37)
- Place of birth: Sweden
- Height: 1.89 m (6 ft 2 in)
- Position: Defender

Youth career
- Utbynäs SK

Senior career*
Years	Team	Apps	(Gls)
2009–2011	Örgryte IS	50	(1)
2012–2013	Falkenbergs FF	58	(1)
2014–2015	Mjällby AIF	42	(0)
2015–2016	GAIS	28	(0)
2017–2020	Örgryte IS	104	(3)
- * Club domestic league appearances and goals as of 5 December 2020

Danny Ervik (born 24 February 1989) is a Swedish footballer who plays as a defender.
