= Kim Skoglund =

Swedish footballer

Personal information
- Full name: Kim Skoglund
- Date of birth: 28 August 1987 (age 39)
- Place of birth: Uppsala, Sweden
- Height: 1.83 m (6 ft 0 in)
- Position: Midfielder

Youth career
- IK Fyris

Senior career*
Years	Team	Apps	(Gls)
2004–2008	IK Sirius	77	(0)
2009–2010	Gamla Upsala SK	42	(17)
2011–2017	IK Sirius	182	(24)
2018–2019	GIF Sundsvall	16	(0)
2019	IK Frej	25	(0)
- * Club domestic league appearances and goals as of 10 November 2019

Kim Skoglund (born 28 August 1987) is a Swedish footballer who plays as a midfielder.

He started his career with IK Sirius in the Swedish lower divisions, making his senior debut in 2004 at age 16. He initially struggled to break into the first team, and enjoyed a two year stint at Gamla Upsala SK between 2009 and 2010, before returning to Sirius. He would then play a vital part as the club won several promotions and ultimately reached Allsvenskan, the Swedish top tier, in 2016. He was not offered a new contract at the end of the 2017 season, appearing in a total of 259 league games for Sirius.

On 12 January 2018, Skoglund signed a three-year deal with GIF Sundsvall, also playing in Allsvenskan.
