= Seth Hellberg =

Liberian footballer (born 1995)

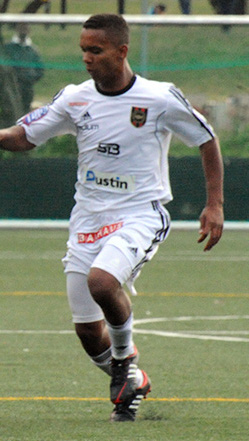

Personal information
- Full name: Bengt Seth Kanteh Hellberg
- Date of birth: 19 August 1995 (age 31)
- Place of birth: Kiruna, Sweden
- Height: 5 ft 10 1/2 in (1.79 m)
- Position: Midfielder

Team information
- Current team: FC Brandbergen

Youth career
- –2013: IF Brommapojkarna

Senior career*
Years	Team	Apps	(Gls)
2014–2017	IF Brommapojkarna	40	(8)
2017–2018	Syrianska	51	(11)
2019–2023	IK Brage	114	(14)
2024	Nordic United	17	(2)
2025–	FC Brandbergen	0	(0)

International career^{‡}
2019–	Liberia	12	(0)
- * Club domestic league appearances and goals as of 1 January 2025 ‡ National team caps and goals as of 19:28, 31 March 2026 (UTC)

Bengt Seth Kanteh Hellberg (born 19 August 1995), known as Seth Hellberg, is a professional footballer who plays as a midfielder for Nordic United. Born in Sweden, he represents the Liberia national team.

== Personal life ==
Hellberg was born in Sweden to a Swedish father and a Liberian mother.

== International career ==
In late August 2019, Hellberg was called up by the Liberia national team. Making the debut on 4 September, he became the first Swedish-born player to represent Liberia.

== Career statistics ==
=== International ===
As of match played 31 March 2026

Appearances and goals by national team and year
National team	Year	Apps	Goals
Liberia	2019	2	0
Liberia	2021	5	0
Liberia	2022	3	0
Liberia	2023	2	0
Total		12	0
