= Amaro Bahtijar =

Swedish footballer

Personal information
- Date of birth: 26 August 1998 (age 28)
- Place of birth: Turkey
- Height: 1.76 m (5 ft 9 in)
- Position: Midfielder

Team information
- Current team: GIF Sundsvall
- Number: 27

Youth career
- Sund IF
- 2016–2017: GIF Sundsvall

Senior career*
Years	Team	Apps	(Gls)
2013–2014	Sund IF	16	(3)
2015	Ånge IF	20	(0)
2016–2018	GIF Sundsvall	2	(0)
2019	IFK Timrå	24	(0)
2020	Steinkjer	0	(0)
2020	Norr United	8	(5)
2021	Hudiksvalls FF	28	(3)
2022–2023	Umeå FC	40	(2)
2024–	GIF Sundsvall	41	(0)
- * Club domestic league appearances and goals as of 12 November 2026

Amaro Bahtijar (born 26 August 1998) is a Swedish footballer who plays for GIF Sundsvall.

== Career ==
Bahtijar started his career at Sund IF, where he in a very young age played for the club's reserve team and later, at the age of 15, played for the club's first team in the Swedish Division 4.

Ahead of the 2015 season, Bathijar moved to Ånge IF, where he played in the Swedish Division 2 at the age of 16 and 17. His performances, despite his young age, did not go unnoticed and in November 2015, when he was 17, Bathijar and his cousin Hari Halilovic, was invited to a trial at Italian club Udinese, where they would train with the Italian club's first team. Ahead of the trial, it was reported that Bathijar would train with GIF Sundsvall up until the trial, which would start at the end of November 2015.

Returning from Udinese and ahead of the 2016 season, he was sold from Ånge IF to GIF Sundsvall. He made his debut at the age of 19 in the Allsvenskan in April 2017.

On 4 January 2019, Bahtijar signed with Swedish Division 2 club IFK Timrå. Bathijar made 24 appearances during the 2019 league season, before he left the club at the end of the year.

In January 2020, Bahtijar and his teammate from Timrå, Granit Buzuku, moved to Norway, signing with Steinkjer FK. However, due to the COVID-19 pandemic in Norway, he never made an official appearance for the club and ended up returning to Sweden. To keep fit, he began playing for Swedish Division 5 club FC Norr United, where he played the rest of the year.

On 1 March 2021, Swedish Division 1 club Hudiksvalls FF confirmed, that Bathijar had joined the club.

On 29 December 2023, Bahtijar returned to GIF Sundsvall for the 2024 season.

== Personal life ==
Bahtijar was born in Turkey but his mother is from Serbia. Bahtijar and his mother moved to Sweden together, when he was a child. When he was 13, they moved to Sundsvall.
