= Perparim Beqaj =

Swedish footballer

Personal information
- Date of birth: 3 August 1995 (age 31)
- Place of birth: Laholm, Sweden
- Height: 1.83 m (6 ft 0 in)
- Position: Forward

Team information
- Current team: Norrby
- Number: 7

Youth career
- –2010: Laholms FK

Senior career*
Years	Team	Apps	(Gls)
2011–2013	Laholms FK	37	(14)
2013–2015	Halmstads BK	3	(0)
2016–2017	Tvååkers IF	49	(19)
2018–2019	Varbergs BoIS	55	(13)
2020	Jönköpings Södra	0	(0)
2020	Ljungskile SK	27	(3)
2021	Jönköpings Södra	22	(1)
2022–	Norrby	2	(0)
- * Club domestic league appearances and goals as of 11 April 2022

Perparim Beqaj (born 3 August 1995) is a Swedish footballer who plays as a forward for Norrby.

== Career ==
=== Club career ===
On 26 November 2019 it was confirmed, that Begaj would join Jönköpings Södra IF from the 2020 season, signing a two-year deal. However, on 17 March 2020, he joined Ljungskile SK instead.

In January 2021, Beqaj returned to Jönköpings Södra, where he signed a two-year contract. However, he left the club again at the end of 2021.

On 10 February 2022, Beqaj signed with Norrby.

== Personal life ==
Born in Sweden, Beqaj is of Kosovan descent.
