= Kvibille =

- Location within Halland Location within Sweden
- Coordinates: 56°47′N 12°50′E
- Country: Sweden
- Province: Halland
- County: Halland County
- Municipality: Halmstad Municipality

Area
  - Total: 1 km^{2} (0.39 sq mi)

Population (31 December 2020)
  - Total: 974
  - Density: 970/km^{2} (2,500/sq mi)
- Time zone: UTC+1 (CET)
  - Summer (DST): UTC+2 (CEST)

Kvibille (Swedish pronunciation: [ˈkvɪ̂bːɛlɛ]) is a locality situated in Halmstad Municipality, Halland County, Sweden, with 974 inhabitants in 2020.

== Sports ==
The football club Kvibille BK is located in Kvibille.
