= Norrtälje Sportcentrum =

Football stadium in Norrtälje, Sweden

Coordinates: 59°45′07″N 18°41′51″E

Norrtälje Sportcentrum is a football stadium in Norrtälje, Sweden and the home stadium for the football team BKV Norrtälje. Norrtälje Sportcentrum has a total capacity of 1,000 spectators.
