= Kvibille BK =

Swedish football club

- Full name: Kvibille Bollklubb
- Nickname: KBK
- Founded: 1940
- Ground: Björkevi; Kvibille; Sweden
- Head coach: Mats Altemyr
- Coach: Roger Bengtsson
- League: Division 4 Halland Elit
Home colours	Away colours

Kvibille BK is a Swedish football club located in Kvibille, in the county of Halland. The club, formed in 1940, play their home matches at Björkevi. The club came agonizingly close of being promoted to division 3 on two occasions, in recent years. During the 2013 season Kvibille BK finished 5th, just a couple of points short of 1st place. History repeated itself the following season. Kvibille BK finished 6th, with a small gap to 2nd place, which would have meant a possible promotion.

== Background ==
Kvibille BK currently plays in Division 4 Halland Elit which is the sixth tier of Swedish football. They play their home matches at Björkevi in Kvibille.

The club is affiliated to Hallands Fotbollförbund and has made five appearances to date in the Svenska Cupen in 1992/93, 2004, 2005, 2012 and 2014. During the season of 2012, Kvibille BK was eliminated in round one (in Svenska Cupen) against Torns IF with the score 1–3. Goal scorers: Nilsson, Grönevik and Rendin, Kvibille BK: Victor Jarälv. In 2014 Kvibille BK was eliminated in round one, with a 0–1 defeat against IS Halmia. Goal scorer: P.Gulda.

== Season to season ==
Season	Level	Division	Section	Position	Movements
2006*	Tier 6	Division 4	Halland	7th	
2007	Tier 6	Division 4	Halland	12th	Relegated
2008	Tier 7	Division 5	Halland	6th	
2009	Tier 7	Division 5	Halland	4th	
2010	Tier 7	Division 5	Halland	3rd	
2011	Tier 7	Division 5	Halland	2nd	Promoted
2012	Tier 6	Division 4	Halland Elit	7th	
2013	Tier 6	Division 4	Halland Elit	5th	
2014	Tier 6	Division 4	Halland Elit	6th	

* League restructuring in 2006 resulted in a new division being created at Tier 3 and subsequent divisions dropping a level.

== Current squad ==
Note: Flags indicate national team as defined under FIFA eligibility rules; some limited exceptions apply. Players may hold more than one non-FIFA nationality.

No.	Pos.	Nation	Player
1	GK	SWE	Dennis Nilsson
2	DF	SWE	Robin Larsson
3	DF	SWE	Victor Jarälv
4	DF	SWE	Linus Bengtsson
5	DF	SWE	Morgan Gunnander
6	DF	SWE	Alexander Jönsson
7	FW	SWE	Mattias Fredriksson
8	DF	SWE	Fredrik Karlsson
9	FW	SWE	John Wilson
10	DF	SWE	Nadim Al-Mosawi
11	MF	SWE	Alexander Bornhager
12	MF	SWE	Mixhen Zeqiri
13	MF	SWE	Max Lundberg
14	MF	SWE	Driton Lahu
15	MF	SWE	Marco Jansson

No.	Pos.	Nation	Player
16	FW	SWE	Christoffer Jönsson
17	FW	SWE	Nehat Bregaj
18	DF	SWE	Emil Larsson
19	DF	SWE	Alexander Eliasson
20	MF	SWE	Johan Persson
21	FW	SWE	Johan Andersson
22	FW	SWE	Thimmy Johansson
23	MF	SWE	Tobias Östergaard
24	DF	SWE	Christoffer Eliasson
25	MF	SWE	Mattias Olofsson
26	FW	SWE	Marcus Jönsson
27	MF	SWE	Daniel Wångsten
28	GK	SWE	Johan Beike
29	GK	SWE	Kristian Halén
30	DF	SWE	Mattias Andersson
