= BKV Norrtälje =

Swedish football club

- Full name: Bollklubben Vargarna Norrtälje
- Founded: 1933
- Ground: Norrtälje Sportcentrum; Norrtälje; Sweden
- Capacity: 1,000
- Chairman: Lennart Lundin
- Head coach: Peter Hautalahti
- Coach: Janne G Östlund
- League: Division 3 Norra Svealand
- 2025: Division 3 Norra Svealand, 3rd
Home colours	Away colours

BKV Norrtälje is a Swedish football club located in Norrtälje.

== Background ==
Bollklubben Vargarna were founded in 1933, the club's name being changed to Bollklubben Vargarna Norrtälje in 1993. The team plays in red shirts and blue shorts and in recent times has enjoyed several seasons in Division 3 Norra Svealand which is the fifth tier of Swedish football.

Since their foundation BKV Norrtälje has participated mainly in the middle and lower divisions of the Swedish football league system. The club currently plays in Division 3 Norra Svealand which is the fifth tier of Swedish football. The club played a few seasons in Division 2 Östra Svealand in the 1990s. They play their home matches at the Sportcentrum in Norrtälje.

BKV Norrtälje are affiliated to the Upplands Fotbollförbund.

== Season to season ==
Season	Level	Division	Section	Position	Movements
1993	Tier 3	Division 2	Östra Svealand	6th	
1994	Tier 3	Division 2	Östra Svealand	3rd	
1995	Tier 3	Division 2	Östra Svealand	9th	
1996	Tier 3	Division 2	Östra Svealand	11th	Relegated
1997	Tier 4	Division 3	Norra Svealand	8th	
1998	Tier 4	Division 3	Norra Svealand	5th	
1999	Tier 4	Division 3	Norra Svealand	5th	
2000	Tier 4	Division 3	Norra Svealand	7th	
2001	Tier 4	Division 3	Norra Svealand	9th	Relegation Playoffs – Relegated
2002	Tier 5	Division 4	Uppland	2nd	Promotion Playoffs
2003	Tier 5	Division 4	Uppland	4th	
2004	Tier 5	Division 4	Uppland	2nd	Promotion Playoffs – Promoted
2005	Tier 4	Division 3	Norra Svealand	10th	Relegated
2006*	Tier 6	Division 4	Uppland	2nd	Promotion Playoffs – Promoted
2007	Tier 5	Division 3	Norra Svealand	8th	
2008	Tier 5	Division 3	Norra Svealand	5th	
2009	Tier 5	Division 3	Norra Svealand	7th	
2010	Tier 5	Division 3	Norra Svealand	1st	Promoted
2011	Tier 4	Division 2	Norra Svealand	11th	Relegated
2012	Tier 5	Division 3	Norra Svealand	2nd	Promotion Playoffs
2013	Tier 5	Division 3	Östra Svealand	1st	Promoted
2014	Tier 4	Division 2	Norra Svealand	4th	
2015	Tier 4	Division 2	Norra Svealand	6th	

* League restructuring in 2006 resulted in a new division being created at Tier 3 and subsequent divisions dropping a level.

== Attendances ==
In recent seasons BKV Norrtälje have had the following average attendances:

Season	Average attendance	Division / Section	Level
2005	168	Div 3 Norra Svealand	Tier 5
2006	Not available	Div 4 Uppland	Tier 6
2007	128	Div 3 Norra Svealand	Tier 5
2008	125	Div 3 Norra Svealand	Tier 5
2009	84	Div 3 Norra Svealand	Tier 5
2010	201	Div 3 Norra Svealand	Tier 5
2011	213	Div 2 Norra Svealand	Tier 4
2012	108	Div 3 Norra Svealand	Tier 5
2013	224	Div 3 Östra Svealand	Tier 5
2014	248	Div 2 Norra Svealand	Tier 4
2015	219	Div 2 Norra Svealand	Tier 4

* Attendances are provided in the Publikliga sections of the Svenska Fotbollförbundet website.
