= Thierry Zahui =

Ivorian footballer

Personal information
- Full name: Thierry Zahui
- Date of birth: 22 October 1987 (age 39)
- Place of birth: Abidjan, Ivory Coast
- Height: 1.66 m (5 ft 5 1/2 in)
- Position: Midfielder

Senior career*
| Years | Team | Apps | (Gls) |
| 2004–2009 | Africa Sports d'Abidjan | | |
| 2010 | Westchester Flames | 4 | (0) |
| 2011 | Chicago Fire U-23 | 13 | (1) |
| 2011–2012 | Levadiakos | 10 | (0) |
| 2013 | Norrby | 21 | (4) |
| 2014 | Assyriska BK | 25 | (5) |
| 2015 | Prespa Birlik | 19 | (2) |
| 2016–2018 | Landskrona BoIS | 52 | (10) |
| 2018 | Helsingborgs IF | 1 | (0) |
| 2019 | Varbergs BoIS | 1 | (0) |
| 2019 | Assyriska BK | 8 | (0) |
| 2020 | FC Rosengård | 9 | (0) |

Managerial career
- 2021–2022: Lunds BK (assistant)
- 2023: IFK Malmö
- * Club domestic league appearances and goals

Thierry Zahui (born 22 October 1987) is an Ivorian former football player and current assistant coach of Lunds BK.

He has previously played for Landskrona BoIS and the Chicago Fire Reserves.

== Career ==
On 14 August 2019, Zahui returned to Assyriska BK.

At the end of 2020, Zahui decided to retire and was hired as an assistant coach at Lunds BK.
