= Smajl Suljević =

Swedish footballer (born 1994)

Personal information
- Full name: Smajl Suljević
- Date of birth: 15 July 1994 (age 32)
- Place of birth: Borlänge, Sweden
- Height: 1.88 m (6 ft 2 in)
- Position: Midfielder

Youth career
- 2008–2010: Dalkurd FF
- 2011–2012: Stoke City

Senior career*
Years	Team	Apps	(Gls)
2012–2015	Dalkurd FF	63	(7)
2015–2017	GIF Sundsvall	38	(0)
2015	→ IK Frej (loan)	11	(0)
2018	Östersunds FK	4	(0)
2018	→ Dalkurd FF (loan)	2	(0)
2019	Syrianska FC	5	(0)
2019	Inter de Madrid	0	(0)
2020	Jönköpings Södra IF	5	(0)
2021	IFK Haninge	26	(2)

International career
2009	Sweden U17	1	(0)
- * Club domestic league appearances and goals as of 12:16, 7 February 2021 (UTC)

Smajl Suljević (born 15 July 1994) is a Swedish footballer who plays as a midfielder.

== Club career ==
Suljević was born in Borlänge and began his career with Dalkurd FF before joining English club Stoke City in March 2011. However, he made little impact at Stoke, making a handful of reserve appearances and he soon returned to Dalkurd. In February 2015 Suljević joined Allsvenskan side GIF Sundsvall. He made his professional debut on 20 April 2015 in a 3–1 victory away at Örebro SK.

== International career ==
Suljević represented the Sweden U17 team once in 2009.

== Personal life ==
In Sundsvall, he was threatened with a knife and robbed.
