= Emil Bellander =

Swedish footballer

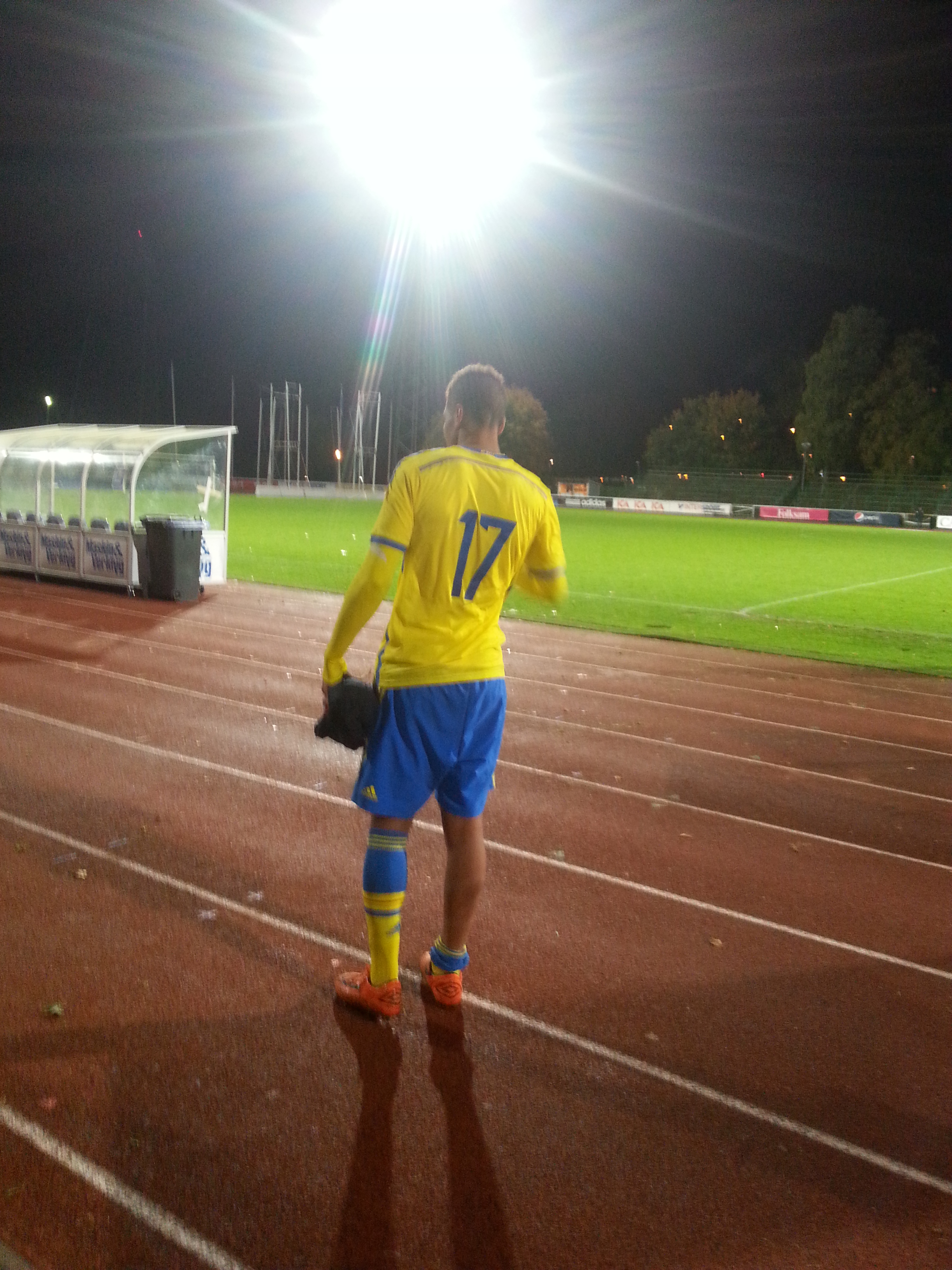

Personal information
- Full name: Emil Alejon Bellander
- Date of birth: 5 January 1994 (age 32)
- Place of birth: Uppsala, Sweden
- Height: 1.92 m (6 ft 4 in)
- Position: Forward

Team information
- Current team: Vasalunds IF
- Number: 9

Youth career
- –2007: Alunda IF
- 2007–2012: Gefle IF

Senior career*
| Years | Team | Apps | (Gls) |
| 2012–2016 | Gefle IF | 36 | (2) |
| 2015 | → IF Brommapojkarna (loan) | 4 | (1) |
| 2017 | Åtvidabergs FF | 23 | (2) |
| 2018–2021 | Sandvikens IF | 89 | (36) |
| 2022 | Vasalunds IF | 24 | (9) |
| 2023 | Skövde AIK | 8 | (1) |
| 2023–2024 | Vasalunds IF | 43 | (5) |

International career
| 2013–2014 | Sweden U19 | 3 | (1) |
- * Club domestic league appearances and goals as of 1 January 2025

Emil Bellander (born 5 January 1994) is a Swedish footballer who plays as a forward.

== Career ==
In March 2013, Bellander extended his contract with Gefle IF, signing a three year contract. On 29 May 2013, he was part of the Borgarskolan team that won the Swedish school championship at high school level, after defeating Aspero Sports High School. He scored his first league goal against Djurgårdens IF on 4 October 2014, scoring in the 7th minute. At the beginning of the 2016 season, Bellander suffered a hamstring injury that would keep him out for two to four months. On 30 October 2016, Bellander was involved in a goal described as "crazy", which helped Gefle avoid relegation from the Allsvenskan.

On 4 June 2015, Bellander was announced at IF Brommapojkarna on loan for the 2015 season.

On 2 January 2017, Bellander was announced at Åtvidabergs FF on a two year contract. During his only season with Åtvidabergs FF, he played 23 games.

On 13 March 2018, Bellander was announced at Sandvikens IF. After scoring 12 goals during the 2020 Ettan season, Bellander extended his contract with the club on 6 January 2021.

On 2 April 2022, Bellander was announced at Vasalunds IF.

On 28 November 2022, Bellander was announced at Skövde AIK on a contract that extends through the 2024 season. This was his first time returning to the Superettan after a few years, and described himself as having "become a better player."

On 24 July 2023, Bellander returned to Vasalunds IF.

== Personal life ==
Bellander grew up in Tierp, Uppsala, to a Swedish mother and American father.
