= 2018 Division 1 (Swedish football) =

Division 1
- Season: 2018
- Champions: Västerås SK (Norra); Mjällby AIF (Södra)
- Promoted: Mjällby AIF; Västerås SK; Syrianska FC
- Relegated: FK Karlskrona; Grebbestads IF; Ängelholms FF; Husqvarna FF; Arameisk-Syrianska IF; Assyriska FF; Skellefteå FF
- Top goalscorer: Nikolas Vasic (21 goals, Norra); Robin Strömberg (20 goals, Södra)
- Highest attendance: 5,069; Västerås SK 3–0 Akropolis IF (14 April 2018)

The 2018 Division 1, part of the 2018 Swedish football season was the 13th season of Sweden's third-tier football league in its current format. The 2018 fixtures were released in December 2017. The season started on 7 April 2018 and ended on 10 November 2018.

== Teams ==
32 teams contest the league divided into two divisions, Norra and Södra. 28 returning from the 2017 season, two relegated from Superettan and two promoted from Division 2. The champion of each division will qualify directly for promotion to Superettan, the two runners-up has to play a play-off against the thirteenth and fourteenth team from Superettan to decide who will play in Superettan 2019. The bottom three teams in each division will qualify directly for relegation to Division 2.

=== Stadia and locations ===
==== Norra ====
Team	Location	Stadium	Stadium capacity
Akropolis IF	Stockholm	Spånga IP	300
Arameisk-Syrianska IF	Botkyrka	Brunna IP	1,000
Assyriska FF	Södertälje	Södertälje Fotbollsarena	6,700
BK Forward	Örebro	Trängens IP	4,700
Carlstad United	Karlstad	Tingvalla IP	10,000
Karlslunds IF HFK	Örebro	Karlslund Arena	2,000
FC Linköping City	Linköping	Linköping Arena	8,500
Nyköpings BIS	Nyköping	Rosvalla IP	1,000
Rynninge IK	Örebro	Grenadjärvallen	1,500
Sandvikens IF	Sandviken	Jernvallen	7,000
Skellefteå FF	Skellefteå	Norrvalla IP	1,500
Sollentuna FK	Sollentuna	Sollentunavallen	4,500
Syrianska FC	Södertälje	Södertälje Fotbollsarena	6,400
Team TG	Umeå	Tegstunets IP	1,000
Umeå FC	Umeå	Umeå Energi Arena	10,000
Västerås SK	Västerås	Solid Park Arena	7,000

==== Södra ====
Team	Location	Stadium	Stadium capacity
Eskilsminne IF	Helsingborg	Harlyckans IP	3,500
FK Karlskrona	Karlskrona	Västra Mark IP	4,000
Grebbestads IF	Grebbestad	Siljevi	1,000
Husqvarna FF	Huskvarna	Vapenvallen	4,000
IK Oddevold	Uddevalla	Rimnersvallen	10,600
Kristianstad FC	Kristianstad	Kristianstad Fotbollsarena	3,000
Ljungskile SK	Ljungskile	Uddevalla Arena	5,500
Lunds BK	Lund	Klostergårdens IP	5,000
Mjällby AIF	Hällevik	Strandvallen	6,750
Oskarshamns AIK	Oskarshamn	Arena Oskarshamn	2,000
Skövde AIK	Skövde	Södermalms IP	4,500
Torns IF	Stångby	Tornvallen	1,000
Tvååkers IF	Tvååker	Övrevi IP	1,000
Utsiktens BK	Gothenburg	Ruddalens IP	5,000
Åtvidabergs FF	Åtvidaberg	Kopparvallen	8,000
Ängelholms FF	Ängelholm	Ängelholms IP	5,000

== League tables ==
=== Norra ===
Pos	Team	Pld	W	D	L	GF	GA	GD	Pts	Promotion, qualification or relegation
1	Västerås SK (C, P)	30	22	2	6	56	26	+30	68	Promotion to Superettan
2	Syrianska FC (O, P)	30	18	5	7	56	37	+19	59	Qualification to Promotion playoffs
3	Carlstad United	30	14	12	4	65	39	+26	54	
4	Akropolis IF	30	15	8	7	65	42	+23	53	
5	Umeå FC	30	14	7	9	45	38	+7	49	
6	Sandvikens IF	30	12	9	9	47	39	+8	45	
7	Sollentuna FK	30	11	10	9	40	38	+2	43	
8	BK Forward	30	12	7	11	48	49	−1	43	
9	FC Linköping City	30	10	10	10	44	47	−3	40	
10	Nyköpings BIS	30	9	11	10	47	54	−7	38	
11	Rynninge IK	30	10	7	13	46	48	−2	37	
12	Team TG	30	10	6	14	44	45	−1	36	
13	Karlslunds IF (O)	30	8	11	11	36	47	−11	35	Qualification to Relegation Playoffs
14	Arameisk-Syrianska IF (R)	30	6	5	19	40	77	−37	23	Relegation to Division 2
15	Assyriska FF (R)	30	5	6	19	45	71	−26	21	Relegation to Division 2
16	Skellefteå FF (R)	30	1	10	19	40	67	−27	13	Relegation to Division 2

Source: svenskfotboll.se (in Swedish)
Rules for classification: 1) Points; 2) Goal difference; 3) Number of goals scored; 4) Head-to-head points; 5) Head-to-head goal difference; 6) Head-to-head away goals scored
(C) Champions; (O) Play-off winners; (P) Promoted; (R) Relegated

=== Norra Results ===
Home \ Away	AIF	ASIF	AFF	BKF	CU	FCLC	KIF	NBIS	RIK	SIF	SFF	SFK	SFC	TTG	UFC	VSK
Akropolis IF	—	4–0	4–0	5–1	2–2	3–1	5–1	1–1	3–2	0–2	2–2	1–1	1–2	1–0	1–0	1–2
Arameisk-Syrianska IF	4–1	—	3–1	1–1	1–8	2–4	1–2	0–1	1–1	1–2	5–3	0–2	2–3	2–4	0–1	1–3
Assyriska FF	2–4	3–1	—	0–3	0–2	2–4	2–4	2–1	2–3	1–3	3–3	4–1	2–2	0–0	1–2	0–2
BK Forward	3–4	4–1	2–1	—	3–1	3–1	3–1	4–2	1–0	2–1	2–1	0–2	0–1	1–1	0–1	2–1
Carlstad United	2–4	2–2	2–0	1–1	—	3–1	1–1	3–3	2–2	3–1	3–3	0–0	1–0	3–1	3–1	2–3
FC Linköping City	0–0	1–2	2–1	1–0	0–0	—	1–1	1–1	3–0	1–1	2–1	1–0	2–4	1–0	1–1	1–0
Karlslunds IF HFK	1–0	0–0	4–5	3–1	0–1	0–0	—	1–3	3–2	0–4	0–0	1–1	0–1	2–2	0–3	1–2
Nyköpings BIS	1–1	0–4	4–4	1–1	2–2	4–0	0–2	—	2–2	0–0	2–0	5–2	2–5	3–1	1–1	1–0
Rynninge IK	0–2	4–0	2–1	2–2	1–2	1–3	2–2	2–0	—	2–0	3–2	0–0	2–1	1–2	2–1	3–1
Sandvikens IF	3–0	2–2	2–1	0–2	0–3	1–1	1–1	5–0	3–1	—	3–2	3–4	1–0	2–1	0–2	1–3
Skellefteå FF	2–6	2–3	2–2	4–1	1–1	1–1	1–2	0–2	0–0	1–2	—	1–2	1–2	0–1	1–1	1–3
Sollentuna FK	2–2	2–0	1–1	1–1	0–2	3–2	0–0	1–0	1–0	1–1	4–1	—	0–1	1–2	1–1	0–2
Syrianska FC	1–1	2–0	3–1	2–2	3–4	3–2	0–1	2–2	4–2	1–0	3–1	3–2	—	2–0	1–1	0–2
Team TG	1–3	5–0	2–1	5–0	0–4	2–2	2–1	3–0	1–3	1–1	3–3	0–1	0–1	—	3–1	0–1
Umeå FC	0–3	5–0	3–1	2–1	2–1	3–2	1–1	1–2	2–1	1–1	1–0	2–4	1–3	1–0	—	2–0
Västerås SK	3–0	4–1	0–1	2–1	1–1	4–2	2–0	3–1	1–0	1–1	2–0	1–0	1–0	3–1	3–1	—

Source: Swedish Football Association (in Swedish)
Legend: Blue = home team win; Yellow = draw; Red = away team win.

=== Södra ===
Pos	Team	Pld	W	D	L	GF	GA	GD	Pts	Promotion, qualification or relegation
1	Mjällby AIF (C, P)	30	21	6	3	73	29	+44	69	Promotion to Superettan
2	Oskarshamns AIK (Q)	30	16	9	5	59	36	+23	57	Qualification to Promotion playoffs
3	Tvååkers IF	30	17	4	9	46	34	+12	55	
4	Eskilsminne IF	30	16	5	9	51	35	+16	53	
5	Torns IF	30	14	8	8	41	31	+10	50	
6	Ljungskile SK	30	12	10	8	50	30	+20	46	
7	Lunds BK	30	12	6	12	53	49	+4	42	
8	Utsiktens BK	30	10	7	13	47	47	0	37	
9	IK Oddevold	30	10	7	13	35	52	−17	37	
10	Skövde AIK	30	8	9	13	33	41	−8	33	
11	Åtvidabergs FF	30	9	6	15	42	52	−10	33	
12	Kristianstad FC	30	8	9	13	38	51	−13	33	
13	FK Karlskrona (R)	30	7	12	11	39	60	−21	33	Qualification to Relegation Playoffs
14	Grebbestads IF (R)	30	8	8	14	45	54	−9	32	Relegation to Division 2
15	Ängelholms FF (R)	30	8	5	17	28	61	−33	29	Relegation to Division 2
16	Husqvarna FF (R)	30	6	5	19	44	62	−18	23	Relegation to Division 2

Source: svenskfotboll.se (in Swedish)
Rules for classification: 1) Points; 2) Goal difference; 3) Number of goals scored; 4) Head-to-head points; 5) Head-to-head goal difference; 6) Head-to-head away goals scored
(C) Champions; (P) Promoted; (Q) Qualified for the phase indicated; (R) Relegated

=== Södra Results ===
Home \ Away	EIF	FKK	GIF	HFF	IKO	KFC	LSK	LBK	MAIF	OAIK	SAIK	TIF	TVIF	UBK	ÅFF	ÄFF
Eskilsminne IF	—	2–0	1–2	2–0	1–4	2–1	1–1	2–3	1–4	1–2	2–2	3–0	1–0	0–1	3–0	4–1
FK Karlskrona	1–3	—	1–1	4–2	1–1	1–0	2–1	5–4	2–2	1–1	1–1	1–1	1–3	2–2	0–4	0–0
Grebbestads IF	2–2	0–2	—	1–2	1–1	3–1	1–2	2–1	3–2	1–2	1–2	2–2	0–1	4–1	3–1	2–3
Husqvarna FF	2–2	1–2	2–3	—	2–3	3–3	2–4	2–0	0–0	0–3	0–1	0–1	1–2	2–3	4–2	4–2
IK Oddevold	1–4	0–0	1–1	2–1	—	4–0	1–0	1–0	1–2	0–3	1–0	0–2	0–3	1–2	1–0	3–1
Kristianstad FC	0–2	4–3	2–2	3–1	1–2	—	1–1	0–1	1–2	1–1	3–3	0–0	4–3	1–3	1–0	2–1
Ljungskile SK	1–1	5–0	2–0	1–1	4–1	0–1	—	1–1	1–0	0–1	2–1	1–1	0–1	4–0	3–1	4–0
Lunds BK	1–1	4–2	2–2	2–0	3–0	2–1	1–3	—	0–4	4–5	1–0	1–2	0–1	3–2	6–3	4–0
Mjällby AIF	2–0	2–1	3–2	5–1	6–0	4–1	1–0	2–2	—	1–1	4–1	2–1	2–1	1–1	3–0	3–0
Oskarshamns AIK	3–1	1–1	2–2	3–1	3–0	4–1	2–2	2–2	1–3	—	0–0	1–0	2–3	3–2	1–2	4–0
Skövde AIK	0–2	0–1	3–0	0–5	2–0	0–0	1–1	0–2	1–3	1–2	—	1–1	2–1	4–0	1–0	0–2
Torns IF	1–3	1–1	2–1	1–3	0–0	0–1	1–0	2–1	0–1	2–1	2–0	—	3–0	2–0	4–2	4–0
Tvååkers IF	0–1	2–0	2–1	2–0	1–1	1–1	1–2	0–0	2–5	2–0	1–0	2–1	—	2–1	2–0	4–1
Utsiktens BK	0–1	8–1	3–0	0–0	4–2	1–0	4–1	0–1	3–2	2–2	1–1	1–2	0–0	—	1–1	0–1
Åtvidabergs FF	0–2	2–0	3–1	3–2	2–1	1–1	1–1	3–1	0–1	0–2	1–1	1–1	4–0	2–1	—	2–2
Ängelholms FF	1–0	2–2	3–1	2–0	2–2	0–2	0–3	1–1	2–1	0–1	1–3	0–1	0–3	1–0	2–1	—

Source: Swedish Football Association (in Swedish)
Legend: Blue = home team win; Yellow = draw; Red = away team win.

=== Playoffs ===
The 13th-placed teams of each division meets the best two runners-up from 2018 Division 2 in two-legged ties on a home-and-away basis with the team from Division 1 finishing at home.

14 November 2018
19:30

IFK Haninge	2–2	Karlslunds IF
Milosavljevic 55'; Hachemaoui 60'	Report	Zahui 45', 51'

Torvalla IP, Haninge
Attendance: 850
Referee: Enzo Vesprini
18 November 2018
16:00

Karlslunds IF	1–0	IFK Haninge
Bell 57'	Report

Karlslund Arena, Örebro
Attendance: 423
Referee: Andreas Johansson

Karlslunds IF won 3–2 on aggregate.

14 November 2018
19:00

FC Trollhättan	2–1	FK Karlskrona
Ödlund 38', 55'	Report	Holgersson 63'

Edsborgs IP, Trollhättan
Attendance: 838
Referee: Kastriot Gerxhaliu
17 November 2018
14:00

FK Karlskrona	2–2	FC Trollhättan
Sigvardsson 21'; Enarsson 48'	Report	Ödlund 54', 72'

Västra Mark IP, Karlskrona
Attendance: 1,389
Referee: Joakim Östling

FC Trollhättan won 4–3 on aggregate.

== Season statistics ==
=== Top scorers - Norra ===
As of 10 November 2018

Rank	Player	Club	Goals
1	(Sweden) Nikola Vasic	Akropolis IF	21
2	(Nigeria) John Junior	Carlstad United	17
3	(Sweden) Leo Englund	Skellefteå FF	16
4	(Brazil) Anderson Ponciano	BK Forward	15
4	(Sweden) Mathias Ranégie	Syrianska FC	15
4	(The Gambia) Alagie Sosseh	AFF / SFC	15
7	(Sweden) Esat Jashari	FC Linköping City	14
8	(Sweden) Emil Bellander	Sandvikens IF	13
8	(Sweden) Christian Kouakou	Nyköpings BIS	13
8	(Sweden) Nicklas Lindqvist	Akropolis IF	13

=== Top scorers - Södra ===
As of 10 November 2018

Rank	Player	Club	Goals
1	(Sweden) Robin Strömberg	Ljungskile SK	20
2	(Sweden) Robin Eliasson-Hofsö	Eskilsminne IF	19
3	(Sweden) Emil Åberg	Eskilsminne IF	18
4	(Sweden) Andreas Birgersson	LBK / MAIF	17
4	(Sweden) Robin Book	Utsiktens BK	17
4	(Sweden) Liridon Selmani	IK Oddevold	17
7	(The Gambia) Bubacarr Jobe	Mjällby AIF	16
8	(Sweden) William Kvist	Oskarshamns AIK	14
