= 2024 Ettan =

19th season of Sweden's third-tier football league

Ettan
- Season: 2024
- Champions: Umeå FC (Norra); Falkenbergs FF (Södra)
- Promoted: Umeå FC; Falkenbergs FF
- Relegated: Piteå IF; Tvååkers IF; Täby FK; Friska Viljor; Onsala
- Top goalscorer: Kerfala Cissoko (19 goals, Norra); Ahmed Awad; Victor Andersson (17 goals each, Södra)

The 2024 Ettan, part of the 2024 Swedish football season is the 19th season of Sweden's third-tier football league in its current format. The season started on 29 March 2023 and ended on 10 November 2024.

== Teams ==
32 teams contest the league divided into two divisions, Norra and Södra. 22 returning from the 2023 season, three relegated from Superettan and seven promoted from Division 2. The champion of each division will qualify directly for promotion to Superettan, while the two runners-up compete in a play-off against the thirteenth and fourteenth teams from Superettan to decide who will play in the 2025 Superettan. The bottom three teams in each division will qualify directly for relegation to Division 2, while the two thirteenth-placed teams play against each other while the top two runners-up from Division 2 play against each other to decide who will play in 2025 Ettan.

=== Stadia and locations ===
Locations of the 2024 Ettan clubs
Red: Ettan Norra; Green: Ettan Södra

Norra

Team	Location	Stadium	Capacity
Assyriska FF	Södertälje	Södertälje Fotbollsarena	8,500
AFC Eskilstuna	Eskilstuna	Tunavallen	7,800
FBK Karlstad	Karlstad	Örsholmen IP	
FC Stockholm Internazionale	Stockholm	Kristinebergs IP	2,145
Friska Viljor FC	Örnsköldsvik	Skyttis IP	
Hammarby Talang FF	Stockholm	Hammarby IP	3,700
IF Karlstad	Karlstad	Tingvalla IP	10,000
IFK Stocksund	Danderyd	Jurek Arena Danderyd	1,000
Karlbergs BK	Stockholm	Stadshagens IP	
Nordic United FC	Södertälje	Södertälje Fotbollsarena	8,500
Piteå IF	Piteå	LF Arena	6,000
Sollentuna FK	Sollentuna	Sollentunavallen	4,500
Täby FK	Täby	Tibblevallen	1,000
Umeå FC	Umeå	Gammliavallen	10,000
Vasalunds IF	Solna	Skytteholms IP	5,200
Örebro Syrianska IF	Örebro	Örnsro IP	1,000

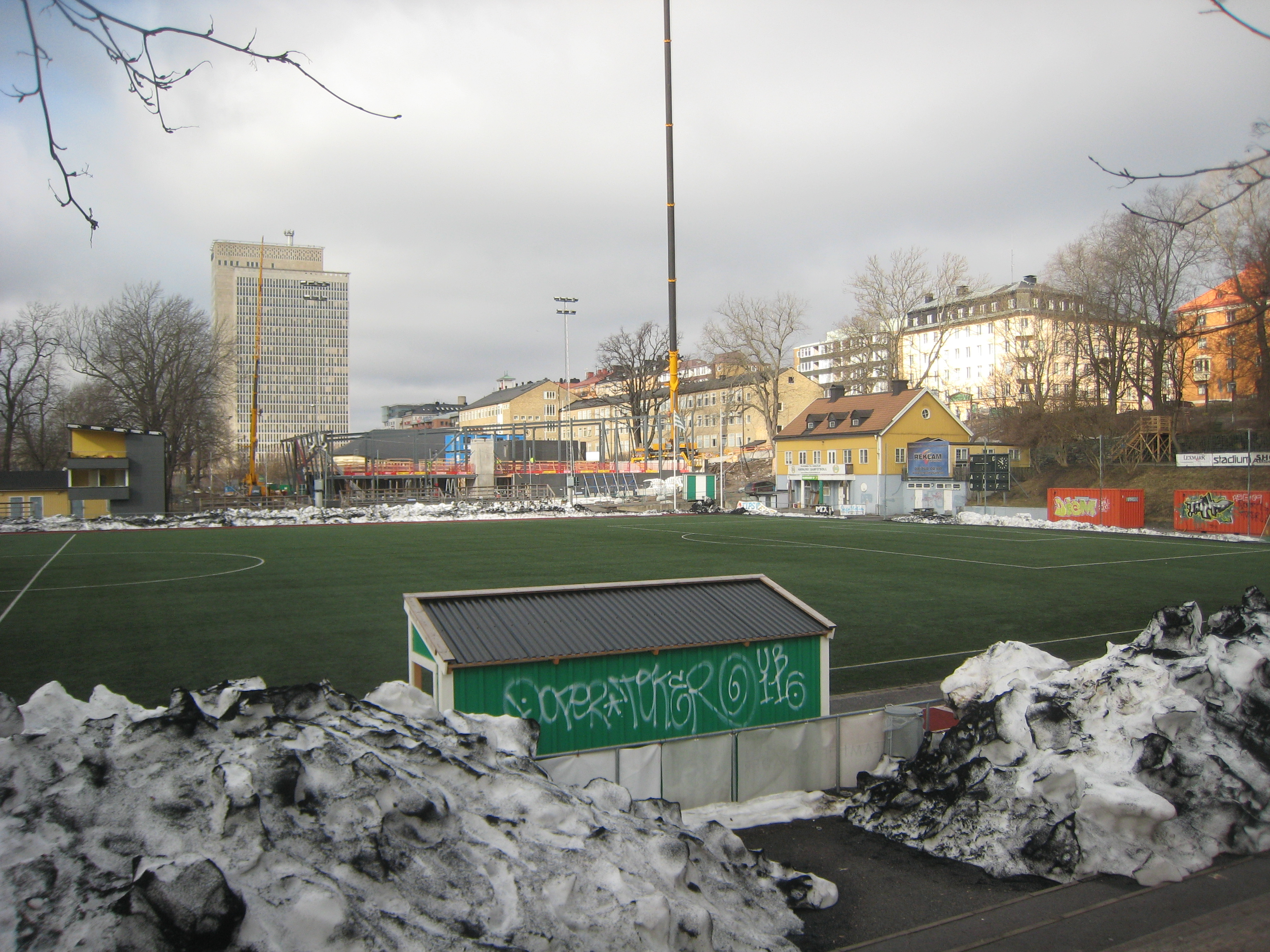
Hammarby IP in Stockholm.

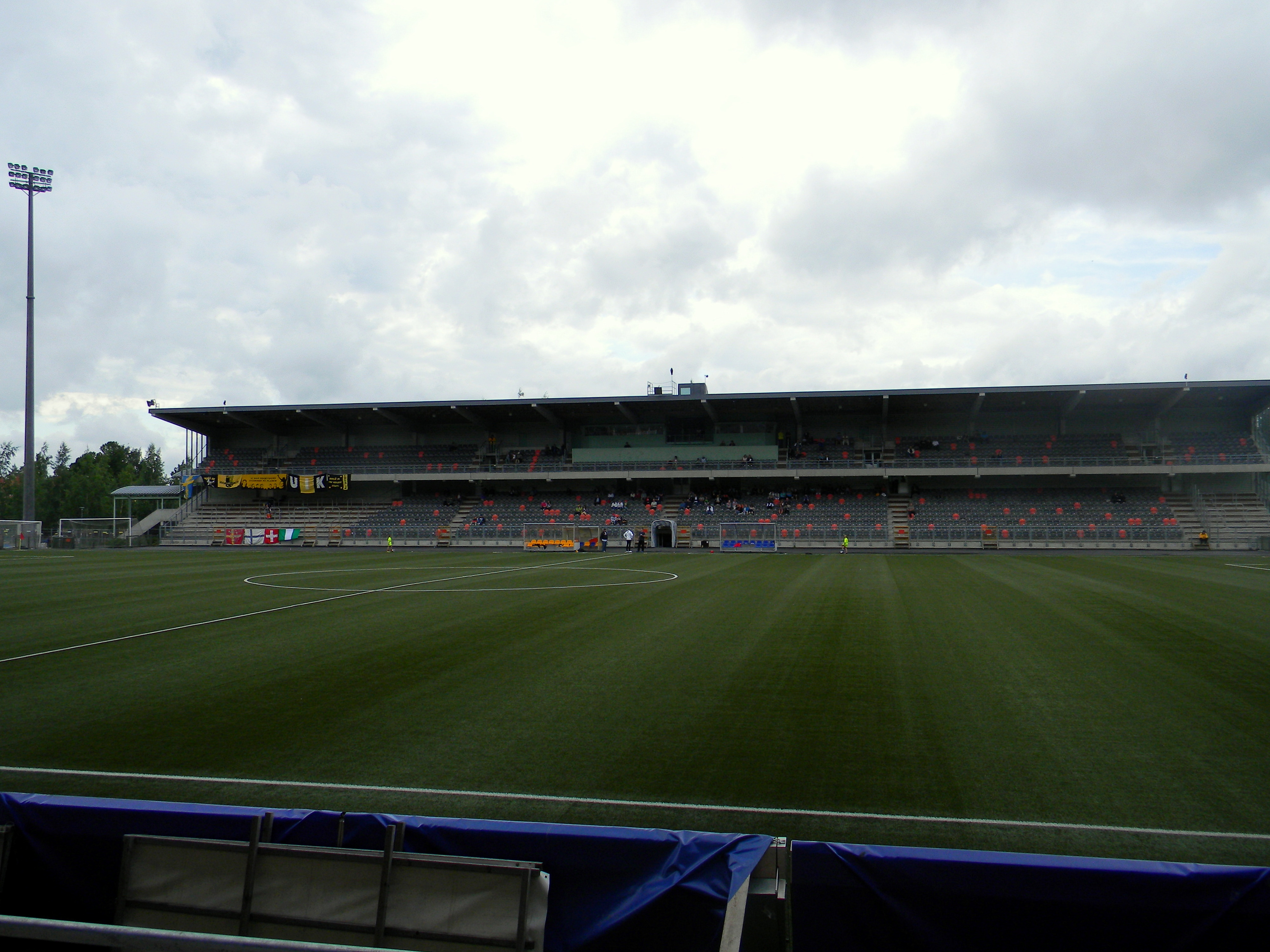
Umeå Energi Arena in Umeå.

Södra

Team	Location	Stadium	Stadium capacity^{1}
Ariana FC	Malmö	Kroksbacks Idrottsplats	
BK Olympic	Malmö	Lindängens IP	
Eskilsminne IF	Helsingborg	Harlyckans IP	
Falkenbergs FF	Falkenberg	Falcon Alkoholfri Arena	5,500
FC Rosengård 1917	Malmö	Rosengårds Södra IP	
FC Trollhättan	Trollhättan	Edsborgs IP	5,100
Jönköpings Södra IF	Jönköping	Stadsparksvallen	7,300
Ljungskile SK	Ljungskile	Skarsjövallen	8,000
Lunds BK	Lund	Klostergårdens IP	8,560
Norrby IF	Borås	Borås Arena	16,200
Onsala BK	Onsala	Rydets IP	
Oskarshamns AIK	Oskarshamn	Arena Oskarshamn	2,000
Torns IF	Stångby	Tornvallen	1,500
Torslanda IK	Gothenburg	Torslandavallen	1,500
Tvååkers IF	Tvååker	Övrevi IP	1,000
Ängelholms FF	Ängelholm	Ängelholms IP	4,000

== League tables ==
=== Norra ===
Pos	Team	Pld	W	D	L	GF	GA	GD	Pts	Promotion, qualification or relegation
1	Umeå (C, P)	30	22	6	2	72	32	+40	72	Promotion to Superettan
2	Stockholm Internazionale (Q)	30	22	4	4	70	24	+46	70	Qualification to Promotion playoffs
3	Nordic United	30	20	2	8	64	31	+33	62	
4	Hammarby Talang	30	15	7	8	56	29	+27	52	
5	Vasalunds IF	30	13	7	10	47	34	+13	46	
6	IF Karlstad	30	14	4	12	51	42	+9	46	
7	Karlberg	30	12	7	11	48	49	−1	43	
8	Sollentuna	30	11	8	11	46	58	−12	41	
9	Stocksund	30	9	8	13	61	63	−2	35	
10	Örebro Syrianska	30	8	11	11	41	45	−4	35	
11	AFC Eskilstuna	30	8	9	13	48	60	−12	33	
12	Assyriska	30	8	8	14	46	62	−16	32	
13	FBK Karlstad (Q)	30	8	7	15	48	60	−12	31	Qualification to Relegation Playoffs
14	Piteå (R)	30	7	6	17	28	63	−35	27	Relegation to Division 2
15	Täby FK (R)	30	5	6	19	33	65	−32	21	Relegation to Division 2
16	Friska Viljor (R)	30	5	6	19	38	80	−42	21	Relegation to Division 2

Updated to match(es) played on 9 November 2024. Source: svenskfotboll.se (in Swedish)
Rules for classification: 1) Points; 2) Goal difference; 3) Number of goals scored; 4) Head-to-head points; 5) Head-to-head goal difference; 6) Head-to-head away goals scored
(C) Champions; (P) Promoted; (Q) Qualified for the phase indicated; (R) Relegated

=== Södra ===
Pos	Team	Pld	W	D	L	GF	GA	GD	Pts	Promotion, qualification or relegation
1	Falkenberg (C, P)	30	19	6	5	51	19	+32	63	Promotion to Superettan
2	Lund (Q)	30	17	5	8	56	40	+16	56	Qualification to Promotion playoffs
3	Eskilsminne	30	14	6	10	42	40	+2	48	
4	Olympic	30	13	6	11	43	39	+4	45	
5	Ängelholm	30	12	9	9	42	46	−4	45	
6	Trollhättan	30	11	11	8	48	41	+7	44	
7	Jönköpings Södra	30	12	8	10	42	40	+2	44	
8	Norrby	30	11	8	11	43	34	+9	41	
9	Rosengård 1917	30	11	8	11	40	35	+5	41	
10	Torslanda	30	11	7	12	40	36	+4	40	
11	Ljungskile	30	11	5	14	39	54	−15	38	
12	Oskarshamn	30	9	10	11	41	47	−6	37	
13	Ariana	30	10	5	15	50	46	+4	35	Qualification to Relegation Playoffs
14	Torn	30	8	10	12	33	50	−17	34	Relegation to Division 2
15	Tvååker (R)	30	8	7	15	32	41	−9	31	Relegation to Division 2
16	Onsala (R)	30	3	9	18	31	66	−35	18	Relegation to Division 2

Updated to match(es) played on 10 November 2024. Source: svenskfotboll.se (in Swedish)
Rules for classification: 1) Points; 2) Goal difference; 3) Number of goals scored; 4) Head-to-head points; 5) Head-to-head goal difference; 6) Head-to-head away goals scored
(C) Champions; (P) Promoted; (Q) Qualified for the phase indicated; (R) Relegated

== Relegation play-offs ==
The 13th-placed teams of each division meet each other, and the best two runners-up from 2024 Division 2 meet each other, in two-legged ties on a home-and-away basis. The winners of each matchup qualify for the 2025 Ettan
