= 2025 Ettan =

20th season of Sweden's third-tier football league

Ettan
- Season: 2025
- Dates: 28 March 2025 - 9 November 2025
- Champions: Nordic United (Norra); Ljungskile SK (Södra)
- Promoted: Nordic United; Ljungskile SK; Norrby IF
- Relegated: Oskarshamns AIK; Torslanda IK; IFK Haninge; Husqvarna FF; Örebro Syrianska; IFK Skövde; Team TG
- Top goalscorer: Kamil Dawid Dudziak; Linus Zetterström (19 goals each, Norra); Vilmer Tyrén (20 goals, Södra)

The 2025 Ettan was the 20th season of Sweden's third-tier football league in its current format. The season started on 28 March 2025 and ended on 9 November 2025.

== Teams ==
32 teams contested the league divided into two divisions, Norra and Södra. 22 were returning from the 2024 season, three relegated from Superettan, and seven promoted from Swedish Division 2.

The champion of each division qualified directly for promotion to Superettan, while the two runners-up competed in a play-off against the thirteenth and fourteenth teams from Superettan to decide who will play in the 2026 Superettan. The bottom three teams in each division qualified directly for relegation to Division 2, while the two thirteenth-placed teams played against each other while the top two runners-up from Division 2 play against each other to decide who will play in 2026 Ettan.

=== Stadia and locations ===
Locations of the 2025 Ettan clubs
Red: Ettan Norra; Green: Ettan Södra
Home venues of teams in the 2025 Ettan in Västra Götaland County

== League tables ==
=== Ettan Norra ===
Pos	Team	Pld	W	D	L	GF	GA	GD	Pts	Promotion, qualification or relegation
1	Nordic United FC (C, P)	30	20	5	5	67	33	+34	65	Promotion to Superettan
2	Hammarby TFF	30	19	7	4	62	31	+31	64	Qualification to the Superettan play-off
3	Vasalunds IF	30	17	5	8	73	41	+32	56	
4	FC Stockholm	30	16	8	6	53	23	+30	56	
5	IF Karlstad	30	16	6	8	64	40	+24	54	
6	Assyriska FF	30	12	6	12	43	41	+2	42	
7	FC Arlanda	30	12	6	12	48	48	0	42	
8	AFC Eskilstuna	30	12	5	13	53	65	−12	41	
9	Karlbergs BK	30	10	9	11	48	47	+1	39	
10	Sollentuna FK	30	10	9	11	47	60	−13	39	
11	Enköping SK	30	10	6	14	47	54	−7	36	
12	IFK Stocksund	30	11	2	17	51	78	−27	35	
13	Gefle IF (O)	30	8	9	13	38	47	−9	33	Qualification to the Ettan play-off
14	IFK Haninge (R)	30	9	5	16	53	69	−16	32	Relegation to Division 2
15	Örebro Syrianska IF (R)	30	7	5	18	33	63	−30	26	Relegation to Division 2
16	Team TG (R)	30	3	3	24	27	67	−40	12	Relegation to Division 2

Source: svenskfotboll.se (in Swedish)
Rules for classification: 1) Points; 2) Goal difference; 3) Number of goals scored; 4) Head-to-head points; 5) Head-to-head goal difference; 6) Head-to-head away goals scored
(C) Champions; (O) Play-off winners; (P) Promoted; (R) Relegated

=== Ettan Södra ===
Pos	Team	Pld	W	D	L	GF	GA	GD	Pts	Promotion, qualification or relegation
1	Ljungskile SK (C, P)	30	21	3	6	82	31	+51	66	Promotion to Superettan
2	Norrby IF (O, P)	30	19	6	5	65	30	+35	63	Qualification to the Superettan play-off
3	Jönköpings Södra IF	30	19	5	6	41	22	+19	62	
4	Hässleholms IF	30	18	3	9	49	31	+18	57	
5	Lunds BK	30	12	6	12	43	41	+2	42	
6	Ariana FC	30	10	9	11	43	41	+2	39	
7	FC Trollhättan	30	10	8	12	53	56	−3	38	
8	BK Olympic	30	10	8	12	47	55	−8	38	
9	Ängelholms FF	30	9	9	12	46	45	+1	36	
10	Eskilsminne IF	30	9	9	12	41	50	−9	36	
11	FC Rosengård 1917	30	10	5	15	31	46	−15	35	
12	Skövde AIK	30	9	8	13	40	59	−19	35	
13	Oskarshamns AIK (R)	30	8	9	13	29	43	−14	33	Qualification to the Ettan play-off
14	Torslanda IK (R)	30	9	6	15	40	58	−18	33	Relegation to Division 2
15	Husqvarna FF (R)	30	8	7	15	47	55	−8	31	Relegation to Division 2
16	IFK Skövde (R)	30	6	5	19	31	65	−34	23	Relegation to Division 2

Source: svenskfotboll.se (in Swedish)
Rules for classification: 1) Points; 2) Goal difference; 3) Number of goals scored; 4) Head-to-head points; 5) Head-to-head goal difference; 6) Head-to-head away goals scored
(C) Champions; (O) Play-off winners; (P) Promoted; (R) Relegated

== Ettan play-off ==
The 13th-placed teams of each division met each other, and the best two runners-up from 2025 Division 2 met each other, in two-legged ties on a home-and-away basis. The winners of each matchup qualified for the 2026 Ettan.

16 November 2025
13:00

Falu BS	0–1	Gefle IF
	Report	Rauschenberg 82'

Kopparvallen, Falun
21 November 2025
18:00

Gefle IF	2–0	Falu BS
Hansemon 34'; Berggren 67'	Report

Gavlevallen, Gävle
Attendance: 1,295

Gefle IF won 3–0 on aggregate.

15 November 2025
14:00

Tvååkers IF	3–3	Oskarshamns AIK
Laci 23', 68'; Malmlöf Johansson 26'	Report	Pettersson 16'; Alnator 17'; Larsson 63'

Övrevi IP, Tvååker
Attendance: 545
22 November 2025
14:00

Oskarshamns AIK	1–2	Tvååkers IF
Pettersson 44'	Report	Munther 50'; Sjöland 68'

Arena Oskarshamn, Oskarshamn
Attendance: 488

Tvååkers IF won 5–4 on aggregate.

== Top scorers ==
=== Norra ===
As of 9 November 2025

Rank	Player	Club	Goals
1	(Sweden) Kamil Dawid Dudziak	Karlbergs BK	19
1	(Sweden) Linus Zetterström	Enköpings SK	19
3	(Sweden) William Videhult	Sollentuna FK	18
4	(The Gambia) Pa Dibba	IFK Haninge	17
4	(Sweden) Lukas Sunesson	Stockholm Internazionale	17
6	(Nigeria) Samuel Adindu	Hammarby Talang	14
6	(Sweden) Shergo Shhab	Nordic United	14
8	(Nigeria) Ibrahim Adewale	IF Karlstad	13
8	(Sweden) Jerome Tibbling Ugwo	Assyriska FF	13

=== Södra ===
As of 8 November 2025

Rank	Player	Club	Goals
1	(Sweden) Vilmer Tyrén	Ljungskile SK	20
2	(Sweden) Linus Lyck	Jönköpings Södra	17
3	(Sweden) Gabriel Johnson	Hässleholms IF	14
4	(Sweden) Tim Amilon Persson	Ängelholms FF	13
5	(Sweden) Linus Carlstrand	Ljungskile SK	12
5	(Sweden) Lukas Lindholm Corner	Ljungskile SK	12
7	(Sweden) Amir Ayari	BK Olympic	11
7	(Sweden) Jamie Bachis	Norrby IF	11
7	(Sweden) Liam Björninger	Torslanda IK	11
