= 2017 Division 1 (Swedish football) =

Division 1
- Season: 2017
- Champions: IK Brage (Norra); Landskrona BoIS (Södra)
- Promoted: IK Brage; Landskrona BoIS
- Relegated: Assyriska BK; Vasalunds IF; Qviding FIF; Enskede IK; IFK Luleå; FC Rosengård 1917
- Top goalscorer: Karwan Safari; Timothy McNeil (17 goals, Norra); Robin Strömberg (21 goals, Södra)
- Highest attendance: 5,627; Västerås SK 3–0 Assyriska FF (13 April 2017)

The 2017 Division 1, part of the 2017 Swedish football season is the 12th season of Sweden's third-tier football league in its current format. The 2017 fixtures were released in December 2016. The season started on 13 April 2017 and will end on 4 November 2017.

== Teams ==
28 teams contest the league divided into two divisions, Norra and Södra. 18 returning from the 2016 season, three relegated from Superettan and seven promoted from Division 2. The champion of each division will qualify directly for promotion to Superettan, the two runners-up has to play a play-off against the thirteenth and fourteenth team from Superettan to decide who will play in Superettan 2018. The bottom three teams in each division will qualify directly for relegation to Division 2.

=== Stadia and locations ===
==== Norra ====
Team	Location	Stadium	Stadium capacity^{1}
Akropolis IF	Stockholm	Spånga IP	300
Arameisk-Syrianska IF	Botkyrka	Brunna IP	1,000
Assyriska FF	Södertälje	Södertälje Fotbollsarena	6,700
Carlstad United	Karlstad	Tingvalla IP	10,000
Enskede IK	Stockholm	Enskede IP	1,000
IFK Luleå	Luleå	Skogsvallen	5,000
IK Brage	Borlänge	Domnarvsvallen	6,500
Nyköpings BIS	Nyköping	Rosvalla IP	1,000
Sandvikens IF	Sandviken	Jernvallen	7,000
Sollentuna FK	Sollentuna	Sollentunavallen	4,500
Team TG	Umeå	Tegstunets IP	1,000
Umeå FC	Umeå	Umeå Energi Arena	10,000
Vasalunds IF	Stockholm	Skytteholms IP	5,000
Västerås SK	Västerås	Solid Park Arena	7,000

==== Södra ====
Team	Location	Stadium	Stadium capacity^{1}
Assyriska BK	Gothenburg	Ruddalens IP	5,000
FC Rosengård 1917	Malmö	Rosengårds Södra IP	500
FK Karlskrona	Karlskrona	Västra Mark IP	4,000
Husqvarna FF	Huskvarna	Vapenvallen	4,000
IK Oddevold	Uddevalla	Rimnersvallen	10,600
Kristianstad FC	Kristianstad	Kristianstads IP	6,000
Landskrona BoIS	Landskrona	Landskrona IP	10,500
Ljungskile SK	Ljungskile	Uddevalla Arena	5,500
Mjällby AIF	Hällevik	Strandvallen	6,750
Oskarshamns AIK	Oskarshamn	Arena Oskarshamn	2,000
Qviding FIF	Gothenburg	Valhalla IP	4,000
Skövde AIK	Skövde	Södermalms IP	4,500
Utsiktens BK	Gothenburg	Ruddalens IP	5,000
Ängelholms FF	Ängelholm	Ängelholms IP	5,000

- ^{1} Correct as of end of 2017 season

== League tables ==
=== Norra ===
Pos	Team	Pld	W	D	L	GF	GA	GD	Pts	Promotion, qualification or relegation
1	IK Brage (C, P)	26	18	5	3	61	26	+35	59	Promotion to Superettan
2	Akropolis IF (Q)	26	17	2	7	68	42	+26	53	Qualification to Promotion playoffs
3	Västerås SK	26	14	3	9	53	32	+21	45	
4	Nyköpings BIS	26	12	5	9	50	42	+8	41	
5	Umeå FC	26	11	7	8	47	42	+5	40	
6	Carlstad United	26	11	6	9	27	30	−3	39	
7	Team TG	26	10	7	9	46	35	+11	37	
8	Arameisk-Syrianska IF	26	11	2	13	40	47	−7	35	
9	Assyriska FF	26	10	5	11	43	52	−9	35	
10	Sandvikens IF	26	9	5	12	35	41	−6	32	
11	Sollentuna FK	26	9	5	12	36	46	−10	32	
12	Vasalunds IF (R)	26	7	6	13	32	40	−8	27	Relegation to Division 2
13	Enskede IK (R)	26	7	2	17	32	66	−34	23	Relegation to Division 2
14	IFK Luleå (R)	26	4	4	18	24	53	−29	16	Relegation to Division 2

Source: svenskfotboll.se (in Swedish)
Rules for classification: 1) Points; 2) Goal difference; 3) Number of goals scored; 4) Head-to-head points; 5) Head-to-head goal difference; 6) Head-to-head away goals scored
(C) Champions; (P) Promoted; (Q) Qualified for the phase indicated; (R) Relegated

=== Södra ===
Pos	Team	Pld	W	D	L	GF	GA	GD	Pts	Promotion, qualification or relegation
1	Landskrona BoIS (C, P)	26	18	4	4	51	18	+33	58	Promotion to Superettan
2	Mjällby AIF (Q)	26	16	5	5	60	29	+31	53	Qualification to Promotion playoffs
3	Utsiktens BK	26	14	5	7	51	42	+9	47	
4	Kristianstad FC	26	11	6	9	48	32	+16	39	
5	Oskarshamns AIK	26	11	6	9	42	44	−2	39	
6	FK Karlskrona	26	11	5	10	43	39	+4	38	
7	Ljungskile SK	26	11	5	10	36	37	−1	38	
8	Ängelholms FF	26	11	3	12	35	36	−1	36	
9	IK Oddevold	26	10	5	11	42	42	0	35	
10	Husqvarna FF	26	7	11	8	49	42	+7	32	
11	Skövde AIK	26	8	7	11	30	36	−6	31	
12	Assyriska BK (R)	26	8	4	14	34	58	−24	28	Relegation to Division 2 (*Qviding FIF was relegated to Division 3 due to economical abuse.)
13	Qviding FIF (R)	26	5	5	16	19	52	−33	20	Relegation to Division 2 (*Qviding FIF was relegated to Division 3 due to economical abuse.)
14	FC Rosengård 1917 (R)	26	4	3	19	32	65	−33	15	Relegation to Division 2 (*Qviding FIF was relegated to Division 3 due to economical abuse.)

Source: svenskfotboll.se (in Swedish)
Rules for classification: 1) Points; 2) Goal difference; 3) Number of goals scored; 4) Head-to-head points; 5) Head-to-head goal difference; 6) Head-to-head away goals scored
(C) Champions; (P) Promoted; (Q) Qualified for the phase indicated; (R) Relegated
