= 2017 Superettan =

Superettan
- Season: 2017
- Champions: IF Brommapojkarna
- Promoted: IF Brommapojkarna; Dalkurd FF; Trelleborgs FF
- Relegated: Syrianska FC; Åtvidabergs FF
- Matches played: 240
- Goals scored: 673 (2.8 per match)
- Top goalscorer: Richard Yarsuvat (17 goals)
- Biggest home win: Trelleborgs FF 6–0 Örgryte IS (24 April 2017)
- Biggest away win: Åtvidabergs FF 0–5 IF Brommapojkarna (22 July 2017)
- Highest scoring: Varbergs BoIS 7–1 GAIS (17 May 2017)
- Longest winning run: 6 matches IF Brommapojkarna
- Longest unbeaten run: 12 matches Dalkurd FF
- Longest winless run: 12 matches Åtvidabergs FF
- Longest losing run: 8 matches Gefle IF
- Highest attendance: 12,766; Helsingborgs IF 1–0 Trelleborgs FF (1 April 2017)
- Lowest attendance: 318; Syrianska FC 1–2 Falkenbergs FF (29 October 2017)
- Average attendance: 2,074

The 2017 Superettan was part of the 2017 Swedish football season, and the 18th season of Superettan, Sweden's second-tier football division in its current format. A total of 16 teams contest the league.

Fixtures for the 2017 season were announced on 9 December 2016.

== Teams ==
A total of 16 teams contest the league. The top two teams qualify directly for promotion to Allsvenskan, the third will enter a playoff for the chance of a promotion.

=== Stadia and locations ===
Locations of the 2017 Superettan teams

Team	Location	Stadium	Turf^{1}	Stadium capacity^{1}
Dalkurd	Borlänge	Domnarvsvallen	Artificial	6,500
Degerfors	Degerfors	Stora Valla	Natural	12,500
Falkenberg	Falkenberg	Falcon Alkoholfri Arena	Natural	4,000
GAIS	Gothenburg	Gamla Ullevi	Natural	18,416
Gefle	Gävle	Gavlevallen	Artificial	6,500
Helsingborg	Helsingborg	Olympia	Natural	16,500
Brommapojkarna	Bromma	Grimsta IP	Artificial	8,000
Värnamo	Värnamo	Finnvedsvallen	Natural	5,000
Frej	Täby kyrkby	Vikingavallen	Artificial	2,650
Norrby	Borås	Borås Arena	Artificial	17,800
Syrianska	Södertälje	Södertälje Fotbollsarena	Artificial	6,400
Trelleborg	Trelleborg	Vångavallen	Natural	10,000
Varberg	Varberg	Påskbergsvallen	Natural	4,500
Åtvidaberg	Åtvidaberg	Kopparvallen	Artificial	8,000
Örgryte	Gothenburg	Gamla Ullevi	Natural	18,416
Öster	Växjö	Myresjöhus Arena	Natural	12,000

- ^{1} According to each club information page at the Swedish Football Association website for Superettan.

== League table ==
Pos	Team	Pld	W	D	L	GF	GA	GD	Pts	Promotion, qualification or relegation
1	IF Brommapojkarna (C, P)	30	19	5	6	59	26	+33	62	Promotion to Allsvenskan
2	Dalkurd FF (P)	30	17	7	6	57	26	+31	58	Promotion to Allsvenskan
3	Trelleborgs FF (O, P)	30	14	10	6	54	32	+22	52	Qualification to Promotion playoffs
4	Falkenbergs FF	30	12	12	6	50	39	+11	48	
5	Östers IF	30	13	9	8	46	35	+11	48	
6	IFK Värnamo	30	14	5	11	53	44	+9	47	
7	Helsingborgs IF	30	11	12	7	40	41	−1	45	
8	Degerfors IF	30	12	8	10	42	38	+4	44	
9	GAIS	30	10	7	13	28	37	−9	37	
10	Norrby IF	30	11	4	15	44	56	−12	37	
11	Varbergs BoIS	30	9	9	12	42	42	0	36	
12	Gefle IF	30	10	6	14	40	48	−8	36	
13	Örgryte IS (O)	30	9	9	12	29	45	−16	36	Qualification to Relegation playoffs
14	IK Frej (O)	30	8	5	17	39	51	−12	29	Qualification to Relegation playoffs
15	Syrianska FC (R)	30	7	3	20	39	66	−27	24	Relegation to Division 1
16	Åtvidabergs FF (R)	30	6	5	19	22	58	−36	23	Relegation to Division 1

Source: svenskfotboll.se (in Swedish)
Rules for classification: 1) Points; 2) Goal difference; 3) Number of goals scored; 4) Head-to-head points; 5) Head-to-head goal difference; 6) Head-to-head away goals scored
(C) Champions; (O) Play-off winners; (P) Promoted; (R) Relegated

=== Playoffs ===
The 13th-placed and 14th-placed teams of Superettan meets the two runners-up from 2017 Division 1 (Norra and Södra) in Two-legged ties on a home-and-away basis with the team from Superettan finishing at home.

8 November 2017
19:00

Akropolis IF	1–1	IK Frej
Haglind-Sangré 88'	Report	Falkeborn 17'

Spånga IP, Spånga
Attendance: 1,000
Referee: Granit Maqedonci (Gothenburg)
11 November 2017
13:00

IK Frej	0–0	Akropolis IF
	Report

Vikingavallen, Täby kyrkby
Attendance: 1,968
Referee: Robert Daradić (Helsingborg)

1–1 on aggregate. IK Frej won on away goals.

8 November 2017
19:00

Mjällby AIF	2–1	Örgryte IS
Enarsson 18'; Löfquist 31'	Report	Atashkadeh 61'

Strandvallen, Hällevik
Attendance: 3,035
Referee: Victor Wolf (Stockholm)
11 November 2017
13:00

Örgryte IS	3–1 (a.e.t.)	Mjällby AIF
Said Adan 69', 83'; Araba 119'	Report	Stagova 32'

Gamla Ullevi, Gothenburg
Attendance: 3,264
Referee: Johan Krantz (Uppsala)

Örgryte IS won 4–3 on aggregate.

=== Positions by round ===
Team ╲ Round	1	2	3	4	5	6	7	8	9	10	11	12	13	14	15	16	17	18	19	20	21	22	23	24	25	26	27	28	29	30
IF Brommapojkarna	8	4	2	1	1	1	1	1	1	1	1	1	1	1	1	1	1	1	1	1	1	2	2	2	2	2	1	1	1	1
Dalkurd FF	9	7	7	4	2	3	2	2	3	3	2	2	2	2	2	2	2	2	2	2	2	1	1	1	1	1	2	2	2	2
Trelleborgs FF	14	10	11	8	6	6	8	6	5	4	6	6	7	7	4	4	6	6	3	3	4	3	3	3	3	3	3	3	3	3
Falkenbergs FF	15	12	12	13	15	11	9	10	7	5	7	8	9	8	5	5	5	5	5	4	3	4	4	5	5	5	5	5	4	4
Östers IF	2	3	1	3	3	5	5	4	4	8	5	7	5	4	6	6	4	3	4	6	6	6	6	6	6	6	4	4	5	5
IFK Värnamo	1	1	4	2	5	7	6	9	12	13	11	9	10	9	7	9	9	9	9	9	8	8	8	8	8	8	8	7	7	6
Helsingborgs IF	5	6	6	6	4	2	3	3	2	2	3	3	3	3	3	3	3	4	6	5	5	5	5	4	4	4	6	6	6	7
Degerfors IF	3	2	3	5	7	4	4	8	8	6	8	5	6	5	8	8	7	7	7	7	7	7	7	7	7	7	7	8	8	8
GAIS	10	11	15	14	10	9	10	11	9	10	9	10	14	11	11	11	11	12	10	10	9	9	11	9	11	12	13	11	12	9
Norrby IF	11	13	13	15	16	16	15	16	14	12	13	14	12	14	14	14	13	10	12	13	12	12	13	12	13	13	10	12	13	10
Varbergs BoIS	13	9	10	9	9	8	7	5	6	9	10	11	8	12	10	10	10	11	11	11	11	11	10	11	10	10	11	13	9	11
Gefle IF	6	14	14	10	11	14	14	15	16	16	16	16	16	16	16	16	16	15	16	16	16	13	12	13	12	11	12	10	10	12
Örgryte IS	4	8	5	7	8	10	11	7	10	7	4	4	4	6	9	7	8	8	8	8	10	10	9	10	9	9	9	9	11	13
IK Frej	7	5	8	11	13	13	13	14	15	15	15	15	15	15	15	15	15	16	15	15	15	16	14	15	15	14	14	14	14	14
Syrianska FC	12	15	9	12	12	12	12	12	11	11	12	13	11	13	13	13	12	14	14	12	13	14	15	14	14	15	15	15	15	15
Åtvidabergs FF	16	16	16	16	14	15	16	13	13	14	14	12	13	10	12	12	14	13	13	14	14	15	16	16	16	16	16	16	16	16

Promotion to Allsvenskan
Promotion play-offs
Relegation play-offs
Relegation to Division 1

Source: everysport.com (in Swedish)

== Season statistics ==
=== Top scorers ===
As of 4 November 2017

Rank	Player	Club	Goals
1	(Sweden) Richard Yarsuvat	Dalkurd FF	17
2	(Sweden) Salif Camara Jönsson	Trelleborgs FF	15
3	(Sweden) Viktor Gyökeres	IF Brommapojkarna	13
3	(Sweden) Nicklas Savolainen	Norrby IF	13
5	(Sweden) Sargon Abraham	Degerfors IF	12
5	(Sweden) Pär Cederqvist	IFK Värnamo	12
5	(Turkey) Deniz Hümmet	Gefle IF	12

=== Top goalkeepers ===
As of 4 November 2017

Rank	Goalkeeper	Club	GP	GA	SV%	CS
1	(Sweden) Damir Mehić	GAIS	29	37	77	9
1	(Sweden) Pär Hansson	Helsingborgs IF	15	15	77	6
3	(Finland) Jesse Öst	Degerfors IF	24	31	76	4
4	(Sweden) Marko Johansson	Trelleborgs FF	30	32	75	7
4	(Sweden) Marko Atanackovic	IK Frej	13	19	75	4
6	(Sweden) Tobias Andersson	IFK Värnamo	30	44	74	5
7	(Sweden) Frank Pettersson	Dalkurd FF	30	26	73	12
7	(Sweden) Rasmus Emanuelsson	IF Brommapojkarna	14	14	73	6
9	(Serbia) Budimir Janošević	IF Brommapojkarna	16	12	72	8

=== Hat-tricks ===
Player	For	Against	Result	Date
(Sweden) Salif Camara Jönsson^{4 goals}	Trelleborgs FF	Örgryte IS	6–0	24 April 2017
(Sweden) Salif Camara Jönsson^{4 goals}	Trelleborgs FF	IFK Värnamo	0–4	2 May 2017
(Sweden) Nicklas Savolainen	Norrby IF	Gefle IF	3–2	15 May 2017
(Sweden) Gabriel Altemark-Vanneryr	Varbergs BoIS	GAIS	7–1	17 May 2017
(Sweden) Tobias Englund	Falkenbergs FF	Varbergs BoIS	3–5	27 May 2017
(Sweden) Mattias Genc	Syrianska FC	Norrby IF	3–4	8 August 2017
(Sweden) Richard Yarsuvat	Dalkurd FF	IK Frej	3–2	9 August 2017
(Sweden) Viktor Gyökeres	IF Brommapojkarna	Gefle IF	4–1	4 November 2017
