= 2026 Superettan =

Superettan
- Season: 2026
- Dates: 3 April 2026 – 7 November 2026
- Champions: IFK Norrköping (2nd title)
- Promoted: IFK Norrköping; Falkenbergs FF
- Relegated: IK Brage; GIF Sundsvall
- Top goalscorer: Christoffer Nyman; Christian Wagner (19 goals each)
- Biggest home win: IK Oddevold 7–0 GIF Sundsvall (23 October 2026)
- Biggest away win: GIF Sundsvall 0–4 Östers IF (15 June 2026); Norrby IF 0–4 IFK Norrköping (25 October 2026)
- Highest scoring: IK Brage 4–5 Östers IF (24 October 2026)
- Longest winning run: 7 matches IFK Norrköping
- Longest unbeaten run: 16 matches IFK Norrköping
- Longest winless run: 12 matches IFK Värnamo; Örebro SK
- Longest losing run: 7 matches IFK Värnamo; GIF Sundsvall
- Highest attendance: 11,786; IFK Norrköping 4–0 GIF Sundsvall (13 October 2026)
- Lowest attendance: 137; Nordic United 4–2 GIF Sundsvall (31 October 2026)

The 2026 Superettan was the 27th season of Superettan, Sweden's second-tier football division in its current format. It was part of the 2026 Swedish football season and contested by 16 teams. The season kicked off on 3 April, and concluded on 7 November. The summer break took place between 28 June–18 July.

== Teams ==
A total of 16 teams contested the league. The top two teams qualified directly for promotion to the 2027 Allsvenskan, the third and fourth-placed teams entered a play-off for the chance of promotion. The two bottom teams were automatically relegated, while the 13th and 14th placed teams would compete in a play-off to determine whether they are relegated.

The following teams have changed division since the 2025 season:

=== To Superettan ===
Promoted from Ettan

- Nordic United – Winner Ettan Norra
- Ljungskile SK – Winner Ettan Södra
- Norrby IF – Superettan Play-off winner

Relegated from Allsvenskan

- IFK Norrköping – Allsvenskan Play-off loser
- Östers IF
- IFK Värnamo

=== From Superettan ===
Promoted to Allsvenskan

- Västerås SK
- Kalmar FF
- Örgryte IS – Allsvenskan Play-off winner

Relegated to Ettan

- Utsiktens BK – Superettan Play-off loser
- Trelleborgs FF
- Umeå FC

=== Stadia and locations ===
Locations of the 2025 Superettan teams

Team	Location	Stadium	Stadium capacity
Falkenbergs FF	Falkenberg	Falcon Alkoholfri Arena	5,500
GIF Sundsvall	Sundsvall	Idrottsparken	8,000
Helsingborgs IF	Helsingborg	Olympia	16,000
IFK Norrköping	Norrköping	Idrottsparken	16,000
IFK Värnamo	Värnamo	Finnvedsvallen	5,000
IK Brage	Borlänge	Borlänge Energi Arena	6,500
IK Oddevold	Uddevalla	Rimnersvallen	4,000
Landskrona BoIS	Landskrona	Landskrona IP	10,000
Ljungskile SK	Ljungskile	Skarsjövallen	8,000
Nordic United	Södertälje	Södertälje Fotbollsarena	6,400
Norrby IF	Borås	Borås Arena	14,500
Sandvikens IF	Sandviken	Jernvallen	7,000
Varbergs BoIS	Varberg	Påskbergsvallen	4,575
Örebro SK	Örebro	Behrn Arena	13,072
Östers IF	Växjö	Spiris Arena	12,000
Östersunds FK	Östersund	Jämtkraft Arena	8,466

== League table ==
Pos	Team	Pld	W	D	L	GF	GA	GD	Pts	Promotion, qualification or relegation
1	IFK Norrköping (C, P)	30	21	5	4	63	18	+45	68	Promotion to Allsvenskan
2	Falkenbergs FF (P)	30	16	6	8	54	40	+14	54	Promotion to Allsvenskan
3	Varbergs BoIS	30	14	9	7	50	37	+13	51	Qualification for the Allsvenskan play-off
4	Östersunds FK	30	12	13	5	38	29	+9	49	Qualification for the Allsvenskan play-off
5	Landskrona BoIS	30	13	9	8	49	35	+14	48	
6	IK Oddevold	30	12	10	8	50	38	+12	46	
7	Östers IF	30	14	4	12	50	46	+4	46	
8	Sandvikens IF	30	12	8	10	50	39	+11	44	
9	Nordic United	30	11	9	10	46	52	−6	42	
10	IFK Värnamo	30	10	5	15	38	50	−12	35	
11	Helsingborgs IF	30	9	8	13	38	51	−13	35	
12	Ljungskile SK	30	7	11	12	38	43	−5	32	
13	Örebro SK	30	6	12	12	33	45	−12	30	Qualification for the Superettan play-off
14	Norrby IF	30	5	13	12	32	45	−13	28	Qualification for the Superettan play-off
15	IK Brage (R)	30	6	9	15	47	58	−11	27	Relegation to Ettan
16	GIF Sundsvall (R)	30	6	1	23	21	71	−50	19	Relegation to Ettan

Updated to match(es) played on 7 November 2026. Source: svenskfotboll.se
Rules for classification: 1) Points; 2) Goal difference; 3) Number of goals scored; 4) Head-to-head points; 5) Head-to-head goal difference; 6) Head-to-head away goals scored
(C) Champions; (P) Promoted; (R) Relegated

=== Superettan play-off ===
The thirteenth and fourteenth-placed teams from Superettan will face one of the two runners-up from the 2026 Ettan in two-legged ties for the final two places in the 2027 Superettan.

21 November 2026
13:00

Enköpings SK	2–4	Örebro SK
Nwafor 19', 80'	Report	Wiedesheim-Paul 27'; Yakoub 39', 84'; Amatkarijo 66'

Enavallen, Enköping
Attendance: 2,784
Referee: Fredrik Oppong
28 November 2026
13:00

Örebro SK	v	Enköpings SK

Eyravallen, Örebro

21 November 2026
15:00

Lunds BK	1–1	Norrby IF
Nilsson 68'	Report	Bachis 82'

Klostergårdens IP, Lund
Attendance: 2,292
Referee: Jasmin Svraka
28 November 2026
15:00

Norrby IF	v	Lunds BK

Borås Arena, Borås

== Positions by round ==
Team ╲ Round	1	2	3	4	5	6	7	8	9	10	11	12	13	14	15	16	17	18	19	20	21	22	23	24	25	26	27	28	29	30
IFK Norrköping	1	1	2	6	11	5	8	7	5	4	3	2	1	3	2	1	1	1	1	1	1	1	1	1	1	1	1	1	1	1
Falkenbergs FF	9	3	6	2	1	2	3	2	2	2	2	3	2	1	3	2	3	3	2	2	2	3	2	2	2	2	2	2	2	2
Varbergs BoIS	12	12	7	10	12	6	2	1	1	1	1	1	3	2	1	3	2	2	3	3	3	2	4	4	3	3	3	4	3	3
Östersunds FK	4	4	9	12	9	11	5	3	6	5	5	7	9	5	5	4	4	4	4	4	4	4	3	3	4	4	4	3	4	4
Landskrona BoIS	13	16	11	7	7	9	10	13	8	9	7	6	4	4	4	7	8	6	5	7	7	6	7	5	5	5	5	5	5	5
IK Oddevold	7	2	8	13	8	10	11	5	4	6	8	8	8	7	9	10	10	9	9	9	9	9	5	6	7	6	6	6	6	6
Östers IF	15	15	10	5	6	12	7	10	11	8	6	5	7	8	7	6	6	8	7	6	5	8	9	7	8	8	7	7	7	7
Sandvikens IF	8	11	14	16	15	13	15	15	15	15	11	10	11	10	10	9	7	5	8	8	8	7	8	9	6	7	9	8	9	8
Nordic United	11	6	12	8	3	1	1	4	3	3	4	4	5	6	6	5	5	7	6	5	6	5	6	8	9	9	8	9	8	9
IFK Värnamo	16	10	5	1	5	8	12	12	14	14	15	15	15	15	15	15	15	14	14	15	12	12	11	11	11	11	10	11	10	10
Helsingborgs IF	2	7	3	9	4	4	6	9	7	7	9	9	6	9	8	8	9	10	10	10	10	10	10	10	10	10	11	10	11	11
Ljungskile SK	10	13	16	11	14	15	13	11	12	13	13	13	13	12	11	11	12	13	13	13	13	13	12	12	12	14	12	12	12	12
Örebro SK	6	5	1	3	2	7	4	6	9	11	12	12	12	14	14	14	14	15	15	14	15	15	14	13	14	15	15	13	13	13
Norrby IF	14	14	15	14	13	14	14	14	13	12	14	14	14	13	12	12	13	11	11	11	11	11	13	14	13	12	13	14	14	14
IK Brage	5	8	4	4	10	3	9	8	10	10	10	11	10	11	13	13	11	12	12	12	14	14	15	15	15	13	14	15	15	15
GIF Sundsvall	3	9	13	15	16	16	16	16	16	16	16	16	16	16	16	16	16	16	16	16	16	16	16	16	16	16	16	16	16	16

Promotion to Allsvenskan
Allsvenskan play-off
Superettan play-off
Relegation to Ettan

Updated to match(es) played on 7 November 2026. Source: everysport.com

== Results by round ==
Team ╲ Round	1	2	3	4	5	6	7	8	9	10	11	12	13	14	15	16	17	18	19	20	21	22	23	24	25	26	27	28	29	30
Falkenbergs FF	D	W	D	W	W	D	L	W	W	W	L	D	W	W	L	W	L	D	W	L	W	L	W	W	D	W	W	L	W	L
GIF Sundsvall	W	L	L	L	L	L	L	W	L	L	W	L	L	L	L	L	L	L	D	L	W	W	L	L	W	L	L	L	L	L
Helsingborgs IF	W	L	W	L	W	D	D	L	W	L	L	W	W	L	W	D	L	L	D	L	D	L	W	L	D	L	D	D	L	W
IFK Norrköping	W	W	L	L	L	W	D	D	W	W	W	W	W	L	W	W	W	W	W	W	W	D	W	D	W	W	D	W	W	W
IFK Värnamo	L	W	W	W	L	L	L	D	L	L	L	L	L	L	L	D	W	W	D	D	W	D	W	L	W	L	W	L	W	L
IK Brage	W	L	W	D	L	W	L	D	L	D	D	L	W	L	L	D	W	L	D	L	L	L	D	D	L	W	L	L	L	D
IK Oddevold	D	W	L	L	W	D	D	W	W	L	L	W	D	D	L	D	D	W	D	W	L	W	W	D	L	W	L	W	W	D
Landskrona BoIS	L	L	W	W	D	D	D	L	W	D	W	W	W	W	L	L	L	W	D	D	D	W	L	W	W	W	L	D	W	D
Ljungskile SK	D	L	L	W	L	L	W	W	L	L	D	D	D	W	W	L	D	L	L	D	L	D	W	L	L	D	W	D	D	D
Nordic United	L	W	L	W	W	W	D	L	W	W	D	L	D	D	W	D	D	D	D	W	L	W	L	D	L	L	W	L	W	L
Norrby IF	L	D	D	D	D	D	D	D	W	L	L	L	D	W	W	D	D	W	L	D	L	L	L	L	D	W	L	L	L	D
Sandvikens IF	D	D	L	L	D	W	L	L	L	W	W	W	D	W	L	W	W	W	L	D	D	W	L	D	W	L	D	W	L	W
Varbergs BoIS	L	D	W	D	D	W	W	W	W	W	W	L	L	W	W	L	W	L	D	L	W	D	L	W	W	D	D	D	D	W
Örebro SK	W	D	W	D	D	L	W	L	L	L	L	D	D	L	L	D	L	L	D	W	D	L	W	D	L	D	D	W	L	D
Östers IF	L	D	W	W	D	L	W	L	L	W	W	W	L	L	W	W	L	L	W	W	D	L	L	W	L	L	W	W	W	D
Östersunds FK	W	D	L	L	W	D	W	W	L	W	D	D	L	W	W	D	W	W	D	D	D	W	D	W	D	D	D	W	L	D

Updated to match(es) played on 7 November 2026. Source: soccerstats.com
W = Win; D = Draw; L = Lose

== Results ==
Home \ Away	FAL	GIF	HEL	IFKN	IFKV	BRA	ODD	LAN	LJU	NUF	NOR	SAN	VAR	ÖRE	ÖST	ÖFK
Falkenbergs FF		1–0	2–3	1–0	3–1	4–1	2–1	4–3	1–1	1–1	2–0	2–1	0–3	1–1	2–1	0–0
GIF Sundsvall	1–2		1–1	1–3	0–1	1–2	1–3	2–1	3–2	3–2	1–0	0–3	0–2	0–3	0–4	0–2
Helsingborgs IF	1–0	5–2		0–2	1–2	2–0	2–2	0–3	1–1	1–1	0–0	0–2	1–3	1–1	4–1	2–1
IFK Norrköping	2–1	4–0	2–0		6–0	3–0	0–0	1–3	2–2	1–1	0–1	3–0	2–0	2–2	2–0	3–0
IFK Värnamo	1–2	3–0	0–1	0–2		0–0	3–1	1–1	2–3	0–2	2–2	0–1	1–1	0–1	1–3	1–1
IK Brage	2–4	0–1	2–0	0–0	5–1		3–4	2–1	2–2	1–2	1–1	1–1	2–2	3–3	4–5	2–4
IK Oddevold	2–1	7–0	3–1	1–2	1–2	2–1		1–1	0–0	2–0	0–0	2–2	2–4	4–1	1–2	1–0
Landskrona BoIS	1–2	4–0	1–2	0–1	1–0	2–2	1–1		1–0	2–0	1–1	3–2	1–1	2–1	2–2	1–1
Ljungskile SK	0–2	1–0	4–1	0–1	0–1	2–0	0–1	1–1		0–2	2–1	0–3	1–3	3–2	2–3	1–1
Nordic United	1–4	4–2	3–1	1–3	2–4	1–0	3–3	1–4	2–2		2–1	2–1	0–0	2–0	4–2	1–1
Norrby IF	2–2	3–1	3–3	0–4	0–3	0–1	0–2	1–3	2–1	0–0		1–1	1–2	3–1	2–0	2–2
Sandvikens IF	4–2	5–0	4–2	1–4	0–1	3–2	0–1	0–1	1–0	3–1	2–2		2–2	4–2	1–1	0–0
Varbergs BoIS	2–1	1–0	0–0	0–2	3–2	3–2	3–1	2–3	2–2	4–1	2–0	0–1		0–0	2–1	1–2
Örebro SK	1–0	0–1	1–2	2–1	1–3	0–3	0–0	1–0	1–1	1–1	1–1	1–1	2–1		1–1	0–1
Östers IF	1–3	1–0	3–0	1–3	3–0	3–2	3–1	0–1	1–4	1–2	2–1	1–0	3–0	0–0		1–0
Östersunds FK	2–2	1–0	1–0	0–2	3–2	1–1	0–0	2–0	0–0	4–1	1–1	2–1	1–1	3–2	1–0	

Updated to match(es) played on 7 November 2026. Source: svenskfotboll.se
Legend: Blue = home team win; Yellow = draw; Red = away team win.

== Season statistics ==
=== Top scorers ===
As of 7 November 2026

Rank	Player	Club	Goals
1	(Sweden) Christoffer Nyman	IFK Norrköping	19
1	(Denmark) Christian Wagner	Sandvikens IF	19
3	(Sweden) Albin Andersson	Falkenbergs FF	18
3	(Lebanon) Leonardo Farah Shahin	IK Oddevold	18
5	(Sweden) Kalipha Jawla	Nordic United/Öster	14
6	(Sweden) Hampus Källström	Falkenbergs FF	12
7	(Sweden) Linus Carlstrand	Östers IF	10
7	(Sweden) Elias Jemal	IFK Norrköping	10
7	(Sweden) Alexander Johansson	Helsingborgs IF	10
7	(England) Ryan Lee Nelson	IFK Norrköping	10

=== Hat-tricks ===
Player	For	Against	Result	Date
(Sweden) Tim Prica	IFK Norrköping	IFK Värnamo	6–0	4 April 2026
(Sweden) Kalipha Jawla	Nordic United	Östers IF	4–2	9 May 2026
(Sweden) Albin Andersson	Falkenbergs FF	Nordic United	4–1	17 May 2026
(Sweden) Gustav Nordh	IK Brage	IFK Värnamo	5–1	21 June 2026
(Sweden) Wilhelm Ärlig	Varbergs BoIS	IK Oddevold	4–2	18 July 2026
(Lebanon) Leonardo Farah Shahin	IK Oddevold	Helsingborgs IF	3–1	23 August 2026
(Sweden) Christoffer Nyman	IFK Norrköping	Nordic United	3–1	29 August 2026
(Kosovo) Aulon Bitiqi	IK Oddevold	GIF Sundsvall	7–0	23 October 2026

=== Discipline ===
==== Player ====
Most yellow cards: 11

- (Cameroon) Daouda Amadou (Helsingborgs IF)
- (Sweden) André Álvarez Pérez (Landskrona BoIS)

Most red cards: 1

- Several players
