= 2017 in Swedish football =

Football in Sweden
- Season: 2017

Men's football
- Allsvenskan: Malmö FF
- Svenska Cupen: Östersunds FK

The 2017 season was the 120th season of competitive football in Sweden. Sweden participated in qualifying for the 2018 FIFA World Cup.

== Domestic results ==
=== Men's football ===
==== 2017 Allsvenskan ====
Pos	Team	Pld	W	D	L	GF	GA	GD	Pts	Qualification or relegation
1	Malmö FF (C)	30	19	7	4	63	27	+36	64	Qualification for the Champions League first qualifying round
2	AIK	30	16	9	5	47	22	+25	57	Qualification for the Europa League first qualifying round
3	Djurgårdens IF	30	15	8	7	54	30	+24	53	Qualification for the Europa League second qualifying round (Note: Since the winners of 2017–18 Svenska Cupen (Djurgårdens IF) qualified for European competitions based on their league position, the berth awarded to the 3rd-placed team (Europa League second qualifying round) was passed down to the 4th-placed team (BK Häcken).)
4	BK Häcken	30	14	10	6	42	28	+14	52	Qualification for the Europa League first qualifying round
5	Östersunds FK	30	13	11	6	48	32	+16	50	
6	IFK Norrköping	30	14	6	10	45	40	+5	48	
7	IK Sirius	30	11	7	12	46	51	−5	40	
8	IF Elfsborg	30	10	9	11	53	59	−6	39	
9	Hammarby IF	30	9	11	10	42	43	−1	38	
10	IFK Göteborg	30	9	10	11	42	40	+2	37	
11	Örebro SK	30	10	6	14	38	54	−16	36	
12	Kalmar FF	30	9	5	16	30	49	−19	32	
13	GIF Sundsvall	30	7	10	13	29	46	−17	31	
14	Jönköpings Södra IF (R)	30	6	12	12	31	46	−15	30	Qualification for the relegation play-offs
15	Halmstads BK (R)	30	5	9	16	29	45	−16	24	Relegation to the Superettan
16	AFC Eskilstuna (R)	30	4	8	18	28	55	−27	20	Relegation to the Superettan

Source: svenskfotboll.se (in Swedish)
Rules for classification: 1) Points; 2) Goal difference; 3) Goals scored; 4) Head-to-head points; 5) Head-to-head goal difference; 6) Head-to-head away goals scored; 7) Play-off
(Note: Play-off is only played if need to decide champion, teams for relegation or UEFA competition and will be played on a neutral ground).
(C) Champions; (R) Relegated

==== 2018 Allsvenskan playoffs ====
15 November 2017
18:00 (UTC+1)

Trelleborgs FF	2–0	Jönköpings Södra IF
Jovanović 20'; Camara Jönsson 65'	Report

Vångavallen, Trelleborg
Attendance: 4,731
Referee: Andreas Ekberg (Bjärred)

19 November 2017
14:45 (UTC+1)

Jönköpings Södra IF	1–1	Trelleborgs FF
Gojani 40'	Report	Islamović 45+3'

Stadsparksvallen, Jönköping
Attendance: 3,913
Referee: Stefan Johannesson (Täby)

Trelleborgs FF won 3–1 on aggregate

==== 2017 Superettan ====
Pos	Team	Pld	W	D	L	GF	GA	GD	Pts	Promotion, qualification or relegation
1	IF Brommapojkarna (C, P)	30	19	5	6	59	26	+33	62	Promotion to Allsvenskan
2	Dalkurd FF (P)	30	17	7	6	57	26	+31	58	Promotion to Allsvenskan
3	Trelleborgs FF (O, P)	30	14	10	6	54	32	+22	52	Qualification to Promotion playoffs
4	Falkenbergs FF	30	12	12	6	50	39	+11	48	
5	Östers IF	30	13	9	8	46	35	+11	48	
6	IFK Värnamo	30	14	5	11	53	44	+9	47	
7	Helsingborgs IF	30	11	12	7	40	41	−1	45	
8	Degerfors IF	30	12	8	10	42	38	+4	44	
9	GAIS	30	10	7	13	28	37	−9	37	
10	Norrby IF	30	11	4	15	44	56	−12	37	
11	Varbergs BoIS	30	9	9	12	42	42	0	36	
12	Gefle IF	30	10	6	14	40	48	−8	36	
13	Örgryte IS (O)	30	9	9	12	29	45	−16	36	Qualification to Relegation playoffs
14	IK Frej (O)	30	8	5	17	39	51	−12	29	Qualification to Relegation playoffs
15	Syrianska FC (R)	30	7	3	20	39	66	−27	24	Relegation to Division 1
16	Åtvidabergs FF (R)	30	6	5	19	22	58	−36	23	Relegation to Division 1

Source: svenskfotboll.se (in Swedish)
Rules for classification: 1) Points; 2) Goal difference; 3) Number of goals scored; 4) Head-to-head points; 5) Head-to-head goal difference; 6) Head-to-head away goals scored
(C) Champions; (O) Play-off winners; (P) Promoted; (R) Relegated

==== 2018 Superettan playoffs ====
8 November 2017
19:00 (UTC+1)

Akropolis IF	1–1	IK Frej
Haglind Sangré 88'	Report	Falkeborn 17'

Spånga IP, Stockholm
Attendance: 1,000
Referee: Granit Maqedonci (Gothenburg)
8 November 2017
19:00 (UTC+1)

Mjällby AIF	2–1	Örgryte IS
Enarsson 18'; Löfquist 31'	Report	Atashkadeh 61'

Strandvallen, Hällevik
Attendance: 3,035
Referee: Victor Wolf (Stockholm)

11 November
13:00 (UTC+1)

IK Frej	0–0	Akropolis IF
	Report

Vikingavallen, Täby
Attendance: 1,968
Referee: Robert Daradić (Helsingborg)

1–1 on aggregate. IK Frej won on away goals.

11 November 2017
13:00 (UTC+1)

Örgryte IS	3–1 (a.e.t.)	Mjällby AIF
Said Adan 69', 83'; Araba 119'	Report	Stagova 32'

Gamla Ullevi, Gothenburg
Attendance: 3,264
Referee: Johan Krantz (Uppsala)

Örgryte IS won 4–3 on aggregate.

== National teams ==
=== Sweden men's national football team ===
==== 2018 FIFA World Cup qualification ====
Pos	Team	Pld	W	D	L	GF	GA	GD	Pts	Qualification
1	France	10	7	2	1	18	6	+12	23	Qualification to 2018 FIFA World Cup
2	Sweden	10	6	1	3	26	9	+17	19	Advance to second round
3	Netherlands	10	6	1	3	21	12	+9	19	
4	Bulgaria	10	4	1	5	14	19	−5	13	
5	Luxembourg	10	1	3	6	8	26	−18	6	
6	Belarus	10	1	2	7	6	21	−15	5	

Source: FIFA
Rules for classification: Qualification tiebreakers

Win Draw Loss

25 March 2017 2018 WCQ	Sweden	4–0	Belarus	Solna, Sweden
18:00 (UTC+1)	Forsberg 19' (pen.), 49'; Berg 57'; Kiese Thelin 78'	Report (UEFA); Report (FIFA)		Stadium: Friends Arena; Attendance: 31,243; Referee: Harald Lechner (Austria)

9 June 2017 2018 WCQ	Sweden	2–1	France	Solna, Sweden
20:45 (UTC+2)	Durmaz 43'; Toivonen 90+3'	Report (UEFA); Report (FIFA)	Giroud 37'	Stadium: Friends Arena; Attendance: 48,783; Referee: Martin Atkinson (England)

31 August 2017 2018 WCQ	Bulgaria	3–2	Sweden	Sofia, Bulgaria
21:45 (UTC+3)	Manolev 12'; Kostadinov 33'; Chochev 79'	Report (UEFA); Report	Lustig 29'; Berg 44'	Stadium: Vasil Levski National Stadium; Attendance: 12,121; Referee: Paolo Tagliavento (Italy)

3 September 2017 2018 WCQ	Belarus	0–4	Sweden	Barysaw, Belarus
19:00 (UTC+3)		Report (UEFA); Report	Forsberg 18'; Nyman 24'; Berg 37'; Granqvist 84' (pen.)	Stadium: Borisov Arena; Attendance: 6,431; Referee: Tobias Stieler (Germany)

7 October 2017 2018 WCQ	Sweden	8–0	Luxembourg	Solna, Sweden
18:00 (UTC+2)	Granqvist 10' (pen.), 67' (pen.); Berg 18', 37', 54', 71'; Lustig 60'; Toivonen 76'	Report (UEFA); Report (FIFA)		Stadium: Friends Arena; Attendance: 50,022; Referee: Hüseyin Göçek (Turkey)

10 October 2017 2018 WCQ	Netherlands	2–0	Sweden	Amsterdam, Netherlands
20:45 (UTC+2)	Robben 16' (pen.), 40'	Report (UEFA); Report (FIFA)		Stadium: Amsterdam Arena; Attendance: 41,244; Referee: Sergei Karasev (Russia)

==== 2018 FIFA World Cup play-off ====
10 November 2017 2018 WCQ	Sweden	1–0	Italy	Solna, Sweden
20:45 (UTC+1)	Johansson 61'	Report (UEFA); Report (FIFA)		Stadium: Friends Arena; Attendance: 49,193; Referee: Cüneyt Çakır (Turkey)

13 November 2017 2018 WCQ	Italy	0–0 (0–1 agg.)	Sweden	Milan, Italy
20:45 (UTC+1)		Report (UEFA); Report (FIFA)		Stadium: San Siro; Attendance: 72,696; Referee: Antonio Mateu Lahoz (Spain)

Sweden won 1–0 on aggregate and qualified for the 2018 FIFA World Cup.

==== Friendlies ====
Win Draw Loss

8 January 2017	Sweden	1–2	Ivory Coast	Abu Dhabi, United Arab Emirates
16:45 (UTC+4)	Kanon 39' (o.g.)	Report	N'Guessan 45+1'; Sio 50'	Stadium: Zayed Sports City Stadium; Attendance: 300; Referee: Amaar Aljenabi (United Arab Emirates)

12 January 2017	Sweden	6–0	Slovakia	Abu Dhabi, United Arab Emirates
19:45 (UTC+4)	Isak 19'; Moberg Karlsson 51'; Andersson 59', 79'; Frick 89'; Ghoddos 90+2'	Report		Stadium: Zayed Sports City Stadium; Attendance: 100; Referee: Eaasa Abdulaah Hasan (United Arab Emirates)

28 March 2017	Portugal	2–3	Sweden	Funchal, Portugal
19:45 (UTC+1)	Ronaldo 18'; Granqvist 34' (o.g.)	Report (UEFA); Report	Claesson 57', 76'; Cancelo 90+3' (o.g.)	Stadium: Estádio do Marítimo; Attendance: 10,415; Referee: Clement Turpin (France)

13 June 2017	Norway	1–1	Sweden	Oslo, Norway
19:45 (UTC+1)	Elyounoussi 44'	Report (UEFA); Report	Armenteros 81'	Stadium: Ullevaal Stadion; Attendance: 11,940; Referee: Daniel Stefański (Poland)

==== Total results summary ====
Overall								Home						Away					
Pld	W	D	L	GF	GA	GD	Pts	W	D	L	GF	GA	GD	W	D	L	GF	GA	GD
12	7	2	3	32	11	+21	23	5	0	1	22	3	+19	2	2	2	10	8	+2

Last updated: 14 November 2017.
Source: Svenskfotboll (in Swedish)

=== Sweden national under-21 football team ===
==== 2017 UEFA European Under-21 Championship ====
===== Group stage =====
Pos	Team	Pld	W	D	L	GF	GA	GD	Pts	Qualification
1	England	3	2	1	0	5	1	+4	7	Knockout stage
2	Slovakia	3	2	0	1	6	3	+3	6	
3	Sweden	3	0	2	1	2	5	−3	2	
4	Poland (H)	3	0	1	2	3	7	−4	1	

Source: UEFA
Rules for classification: Group stage tiebreakers
(H) Hosts

Win Draw Loss

16 June 2017 Group A	Sweden	0–0	England	Kielce, Poland
18:00 (UTC+2)		Report (UEFA)		Stadium: Kolporter Arena; Attendance: 11,672; Referee: Tobias Stieler (Germany)

19 June 2017 Group A	Poland	2–2	Sweden	Lublin, Poland
20:45 (UTC+2)	Moneta 6'; Kownacki 90+1' (pen.)	Report (UEFA)	Strandberg 36'; Une Larsson 41'	Stadium: Arena Lublin; Attendance: 14,651; Referee: Slavko Vinčić (Slovenia)

22 June 2017 Group A	Slovakia	3–0	Sweden	Lublin, Poland
20:45 (UTC+2)	Chrien 5'; Mihalík 22'; Šatka 73'	Report (UEFA)		Stadium: Arena Lublin; Attendance: 11,203; Referee: Jesús Gil Manzano (Spain)

==== Friendlies ====
Win Draw Loss

24 March 2017	Sweden	0–2	Serbia	Marbella, Spain
20:45 (UTC+2)		Report	Živković 28'; Ožegović 36'	Stadium: Marbella Football Center; Referee: Javier Moreno Muñoz (Spain)

27 March 2017	Sweden	4–0	Czech Republic	Marbella, Spain
18:00 (UTC+1)	Strandberg 33', 44'; Mrabti 55'; Tanković 80'	Report		Stadium: Marbella Football Center; Referee: Antonio Barba Chamorro (Spain)

10 June 2017	Sweden	0–2	Denmark	Helsingborg, Sweden
14:00 (UTC+2)		Report	Nissen 61'; Duelund 87'	Stadium: Olympia; Attendance: 4,912; Referee: Antti Munukka (Finland)

==== 2019 UEFA Euro Under-21 Championship qualification ====
Pos	Team	Pld	W	D	L	GF	GA	GD	Pts	Qualification
1	Belgium	10	8	2	0	23	5	+18	26	Final tournament
2	Sweden	10	6	2	2	19	8	+11	20	
3	Turkey	10	5	2	3	14	10	+4	17	
4	Hungary	10	3	2	5	12	14	−2	11	
5	Cyprus	10	2	1	7	8	23	−15	7	
6	Malta	10	1	1	8	8	24	−16	4	

Source: UEFA
Rules for classification: Qualification tiebreakers

Win Draw Loss

5 September 2017 2019 U21ECQ	Sweden	4–1	Cyprus	Falkenberg, Sweden
18:45 UTC+2	Strandberg 3', 5', 38'; Rakip 90+1'	Report (UEFA); Report	Elia 90+3'	Stadium: Falcon Alkoholfri Arena; Attendance: 3,443; Referee: Omar Pashayev (Azerbaijan)

6 October 2017 2019 U21ECQ	Belgium	1–1	Sweden	Leuven, Belgium
20:00 UTC+2	Vanlerberghe 30'	Report (UEFA); Report	Dagerstål 61'	Stadium: Den Dreef; Attendance: 1,332; Referee: Nikola Dabanović (Montenegro)

10 October 2017 2019 U21ECQ	Sweden	3–0	Malta	Helsingborg, Sweden
18:45 UTC+2	Ssewankambo 31'; Strandberg 50', 70'	Report (UEFA); Report		Stadium: Olympia; Attendance: 2,066; Referee: Luis Teixeira (Portugal)

10 November 2017 2019 U21ECQ	Hungary	2–2	Sweden	Budapest, Hungary
17:00 UTC+1	Bíró 16', 18'	Report (UEFA); Report	Engvall 44'; Larsson 85'	Stadium: Szusza Ferenc stadion Attendance: 400; Referee: Adrien Jaccottet Switzerland

==== Total results summary ====
Overall								Home						Away					
Pld	W	D	L	GF	GA	GD	Pts	W	D	L	GF	GA	GD	W	D	L	GF	GA	GD
10	3	4	3	16	13	+3	13	3	1	2	11	5	+6	0	3	1	5	8	−3

Last updated: 14 November 2017.
Source: Svenskfotboll (in Swedish)

=== Sweden men's national under-19 football team ===
==== 2017 UEFA European Under-19 Championship qualification ====
Pos	Team	Pld	W	D	L	GF	GA	GD	Pts	Qualification
1	Sweden	3	2	0	1	5	2	+3	6	Final tournament
2	Republic of Ireland	3	2	0	1	3	3	0	6	
3	Belgium (H)	3	1	1	1	3	3	0	4	
4	Italy	3	0	1	2	1	4	−3	1	

Source: UEFA
Rules for classification: Qualification tiebreakers
(H) Hosts

Win Draw Loss

23 March 2017 2017 U19ECQ	Sweden	1–2	Belgium	Beveren, Belgium
16:00 (UTC+1)	Ingelsson 17'	Report (UEFA)	Verstraete 37'; Rigo 82'	Stadium: Freethiel Stadion; Referee: François Letexier (France)

25 March 2017 2017 U19ECQ	Sweden	3–0	Republic of Ireland	Beveren, Belgium
14:00 (UTC+1)	Ingelsson 25'; Sabovic 52'; Isak 73'	Report (UEFA)		Stadium: Freethiel Stadion; Referee: Cătălin Găman (Romania)

28 March 2017 2017 U19ECQ	Italy	0–1	Sweden	Hamme, Belgium
19:00 (UTC+2)		Report (UEFA)	Gyökeres 69'	Stadium: Gemeentelijk Stadion Vigor Wuitens Hamme; Referee: François Letexier (France)

==== 2017 UEFA European Under-19 Championship ====
===== Group stage =====
Pos	Team	Pld	W	D	L	GF	GA	GD	Pts	Qualification
1	Portugal	3	2	1	0	5	3	+2	7	Knockout stage
2	Czech Republic	3	2	0	1	5	3	+2	6	Knockout stage
3	Georgia (H)	3	1	0	2	2	4	−2	3	
4	Sweden	3	0	1	2	4	6	−2	1	

First match(es) will be played: 2 July 2017. Source: UEFA
Rules for classification: Group stage tiebreakers
(H) Hosts

Win Draw Loss

2 July 2017 Group A	Sweden	1–2	Czech Republic	Tbilisi, Georgia
17:30 (UTC+4)	Gyökeres 77'	Report (UEFA)	Turyna 42', 55'	Stadium: Mikheil Meskhi Stadium; Attendance: 214; Referee: Sergey Lapochkin (Russia)

5 July 2017 Group A	Georgia	2–1	Sweden	Tbilisi, Georgia
17:30 (UTC+4)	Kokhreidze 3'; Chakvetadze 31'	Report (UEFA)	Gyökeres 47'	Stadium: Mikheil Meskhi Stadium; Attendance: 8,300; Referee: Srđan Jovanović (Serbia)

8 July 2017 Group A	Portugal	2–2	Sweden	Gori, Georgia
20:00 (UTC+4)	Leão 70'; Filipe 87' (pen.)	Report (UEFA)	Gyökeres 43'; Karlsson 61'	Stadium: Tengiz Burjanadze Stadium; Attendance: 1,753; Referee: Ola Hobber Nilsen (Norway)

=== Sweden men's national under-17 football team ===
==== 2017 UEFA European Under-17 Championship qualification ====
Pos	Team	Pld	W	D	L	GF	GA	GD	Pts	Qualification
1	France	3	2	1	0	6	2	+4	7	Final tournament
2	Ukraine	3	2	0	1	5	5	0	6	Final tournament
3	Austria (H)	3	1	1	1	5	4	+1	4	
4	Sweden	3	0	0	3	2	7	−5	0	

Source: UEFA
Rules for classification: Qualification tiebreakers
(H) Hosts

Win Draw Loss

23 March 2017 2017 U17ECQ	Sweden	1–2	Ukraine	Gleisdorf, Austria
11:00 (UTC+1)	Dmytruk 78' (o.g.)	Report (UEFA)	Mashchenko 34'; Snurnitsyn 80+1'	Stadium: Sparkassenstadion; Attendance: 350; Referee: Aleksandar Vasić (Serbia)

25 March 2017 2017 U17ECQ	Sweden	1–3	Austria	Rohrbach an der Lafnitz, Austria
15:30 (UTC+1)	Mawana 79'	Report (UEFA)	Aganovic 44', 80+2'; Schmid 55' (pen.)	Stadium: Gansbärenstadion; Attendance: 650; Referee: Omar Pashayev (Azerbaijan)

28 March 2017 2017 U17ECQ	France	2–0	Sweden	Bad Waltersdorf, Austria
17:00 (UTC+2)	Caqueret 55'; Geubbels 65'	Report (UEFA)		Stadium: Thermenstadion; Attendance: 300; Referee: Omar Pashayev (Azerbaijan)

=== Sweden women's national football team ===
==== UEFA Women's Euro 2017 ====
===== Group stage =====
Pos	Team	Pld	W	D	L	GF	GA	GD	Pts	Qualification
1	Germany	3	2	1	0	4	1	+3	7	Knockout stage
2	Sweden	3	1	1	1	4	3	+1	4	Knockout stage
3	Russia	3	1	0	2	2	5	−3	3	
4	Italy	3	1	0	2	5	6	−1	3	

Source: UEFA
Rules for classification: Group stage tiebreakers

Win Draw Loss

17 July 2017 Group B	Germany	0–0	Sweden	Breda, Netherlands
20:45 (UTC+2)		Report (UEFA)		Stadium: Rat Verlegh Stadion; Attendance: 9,276; Referee: Katalin Kulcsár (Hungary)

21 July 2017 Group B	Sweden	2–0	Russia	Deventer, Netherlands
18:00 (UTC+2)	Schelin 22'; Blackstenius 51'	Report (UEFA)		Stadium: De Adelaarshorst; Attendance: 5,764; Referee: Stéphanie Frappart (France)

25 July 2017 Group B	Sweden	2–3	Italy	Doetinchem, Netherlands
20:45 (UTC+2)	Schelin 14' (pen.); Blackstenius 47'	Report (UEFA)	Sabatino 4', 37'; Girelli 85'	Stadium: De Vijverberg; Attendance: 5,203; Referee: Esther Staubli (Switzerland)

===== Knockout stage =====
29 July 2017 Quarter-final	Netherlands	2–0	Sweden	Doetinchem, Netherlands
18:00 (UTC+2)	Martens 33'; Miedema 64'	Report (UEFA)		Stadium: De Vijverberg; Attendance: 11,106; Referee: Bibiana Steinhaus (Germany)

==== 2019 FIFA Women's World Cup qualification ====
Pos	Team	Pld	W	D	L	GF	GA	GD	Pts	Qualification
1	Sweden	8	7	0	1	22	2	+20	21	2019 FIFA Women's World Cup
2	Denmark	8	5	1	2	22	8	+14	16	Play-offs
3	Ukraine	8	4	1	3	9	10	−1	13	
4	Hungary	8	1	1	6	8	26	−18	4	
5	Croatia	8	0	3	5	5	20	−15	3	

Source: UEFA
Rules for classification: Qualification tiebreakers

Win Draw Loss

19 September 2017 2019 WCQ	Croatia	0–2	Sweden	Varaždin, Croatia
18:00 (UTC+2)		Report (UEFA)	Hurtig 62'; Asllani 90+2'	Stadium: Stadion Varteks; Attendance: 452; Referee: Eleni Lampadariou (Greece)

Not played (Note: The Sweden v Denmark match was scheduled for 20 October 2017, 18:15 local time, at the Gamla Ullevi, Gothenburg, but was cancelled by Denmark because of a pay dispute between the Danish team and their federation. UEFA opened disciplinary proceedings against Denmark for refusal to play and, on 16 November, it was announced that UEFA awarded the match to Sweden by a score of 3–0, and fined Denmark €20,000.) 2019 WCQ	Sweden	3–0 (awarded)	Denmark

24 October 2017 2019 WCQ	Sweden	5–0	Hungary	Borås, Sweden
18:45 (UTC+2)	Hurtig 14'; Fischer 20'; Asllani 42', 50'; Seger 43'	Report (UEFA)		Stadium: Borås Arena; Attendance: 5,563; Referee: Meliz Özçiğdem (Turkey)

==== 2017 Algarve Cup ====
===== Group stage =====
Pos	Team	Pld	W	D	L	GF	GA	GD	Pts
1	Australia	3	2	0	1	5	4	+1	6
2	Netherlands	3	2	0	1	4	3	+1	6
3	Sweden	3	1	1	1	1	1	0	4
4	China	3	0	1	2	1	3	−2	1

Updated to match(es) played on 6 March 2017. Source: Federação Portuguesa de Futebol (in Portuguese)
Rules for classification: Goal difference

Win Draw Loss

1 March 2017 Group B	Australia	0–1	Sweden	Albufeira, Portugal
18:30 (UTC+1)		Report	Schelin 60'	Stadium: Estádio Municipal de Albufeira; Referee: Yoshimi Yamashita (Japan)

3 March 2017 Group B	China	0–0	Sweden	Vila Real de Santo Antonio, Portugal
18:30 (UTC+1)		Report		Stadium: Estádio Municipal de Vila Real de Santo António; Referee: Anastasia Pustovoitova (Russia)

6 March 2017 Group B	Sweden	0–1	Netherlands	Lagos, Portugal
15:00 (UTC+1)		Report	van den Berg 81' (pen.)	Stadium: Estádio Municipal Fernando Cabrita; Referee: Edina Alves Batista (Brazil)

===== Ranking of 7th placed teams =====
Pos	Grp	Team	Pld	W	D	L	GF	GA	GD	Pts	Qualification
1	C	Sweden	3	1	1	1	1	1	0	4	Seventh-place match
2	A	Russia	3	1	0	2	3	8	−5	3	Seventh-place match
3	B	Iceland	3	0	2	1	1	3	−2	2	Ninth-place match

Source: Federação Portuguesa de Futebol (in Portuguese)

===== 7th place match =====
8 March 2017 7th place match	Sweden	4–0	Russia	Albufeira, Portugal
18:30 (UTC+1)	Asllani 6', 35'; Fischer 9'; Rolfö 77'	Report		Stadium: Estádio Municipal de Albufeira; Referee: Riem Hussein (Germany)

==== Friendlies ====
19 January 2017	Norway	2–1	Sweden	San Pedro del Pinatar, Spain
18:00 (UTC+2)	Karlseng Utland 21'; Minde 27'	Report	Jakobsson 20'	Stadium: Pinatar Arena Football Center; Attendance: 30; Referee: Marta Huerza de Aza (Spain)

24 January 2017	Sweden	0–0	England	San Pedro del Pinatar, Spain
18:00 (UTC+2)		Report		Stadium: Pinatar Arena Football Center; Referee: Marte Sørø (Norway)

6 April 2017	Sweden	0–1	Canada	Trelleborg, Sweden
18:00 (UTC+2)		Report	Beckie 33'	Stadium: Vångavallen; Attendance: 2,157; Referee: Morag Pirie (Scotland)

8 June 2017	Sweden	0–1	United States	Gothenburg, Sweden
19:30 (UTC+2)		Report	Lavelle 56'	Stadium: Gamla Ullevi; Attendance: 10,011; Referee: Olga Zadinova (Czech Republic)

13 June 2017	Sweden	1–0	Scotland	Växjö, Sweden
18:00 (UTC+2)	Seger 84'	Report		Stadium: Myresjöhus Arena; Attendance: 4,622; Referee: Marte Sørø (Norway)

8 July 2017	Sweden	1–0	Mexico	Falkenberg, Sweden
18:15 (UTC+2)	Sembrant 37'	Report		Stadium: Falkenberg Arena; Attendance: 4,204; Referee: Barbara Poxhofer (Austria)

27 November 2017	France	0–0	Sweden	Bordeaux, France
21:00 (UTC+1)		Report		Stadium: Stade Chaban-Delmas; Attendance: 11,891; Referee: Katalin Kulcsár (Hungary)

==== Total results summary ====
Overall								Home						Away					
Pld	W	D	L	GF	GA	GD	Pts	W	D	L	GF	GA	GD	W	D	L	GF	GA	GD
18	8	4	6	22	10	+12	28	6	1	4	18	6	+12	2	3	2	4	4	0

Last updated: 2 January 2018.
Source: Svenskfotboll (in Swedish)
