= Lorik Ademi =

Swedish association football player

Personal information
- Date of birth: 30 July 2001 (age 25)
- Place of birth: Sweden
- Height: 1.76 m (5 ft 9 in)
- Position: Midfielder

Team information
- Current team: Tvååkers IF
- Number: 6

Youth career
- –2020: Falkenbergs FF

Senior career*
Years	Team	Apps	(Gls)
2020–2021	Falkenbergs FF	14	(0)
2022	United IK Nordic	3	(0)
2023	IFK Haninge	14	(0)
2024	BK Olympic	18	(4)
2025–	Varbergs GIF	22	(5)
2025–	Tvååkers IF	20	(3)
- * Club domestic league appearances and goals as of 16 November 2026

Lorik Ademi (born 30 July 2001) is a Swedish professional footballer who plays as a midfielder for Swedish club Tvååkers IF.

== Club career ==
=== Falkenbergs FF ===
On 17 January 2020, Ademi signed his first professional contract with Allsvenskan side Falkenbergs FF after agreeing to a one-year deal. On 7 March 2020, he made his debut with Falkenbergs FF in the group stage of 2019–20 Svenska Cupen against Norrköping after coming on as a substitute at 78th minute in place of Anton Wede.

=== Later clubs ===
After a serious knee injury that had sidelined him since November 2021, Ademi signed with Division 2 club United IK Nordic in September 2022. Ahead of the 2023 season, he moved to IFK Haninge. In January 2024, Ademi joined Ettan Fotboll side BK Olympic.

In April 2025, Ademi joined Swedish Division 2 side Varbergs GIF.

== International career ==
On 17 July 2020, Zgjim Sojeva, manager of Kosovo U21 said that Ademi, together with his teammate Edi Sylisufaj are in the process of adjusting the documentation and is expected to join the team during 2021.

== Career statistics ==
=== Club ===
As of 1 August 2020

Club	Season	League			Cup		Continental		Other		Total	
Club	Season	Division	Apps	Goals	Apps	Goals	Apps	Goals	Apps	Goals	Apps	Goals
Falkenbergs FF	2020	Allsvenskan	7	0	1	0	—				8	0
Falkenbergs FF	Total		7	0	1	0	—				8	0
Career total			7	0	1	0	—				8	0
