= Edi Sylisufaj =

Kosovan footballer

Personal information
- Date of birth: 8 March 2000 (age 26)
- Place of birth: Sweden
- Height: 1.79 m (5 ft 10 in)
- Position: Forward

Team information
- Current team: Landskrona BoIS
- Number: 9

Youth career
- 2006–2017: Falkenberg

Senior career*
| Years | Team | Apps | (Gls) |
| 2016–2022 | Falkenberg | 70 | (11) |
| 2021–2022 | → Sirius (loan) | 15 | (3) |
| 2022–2024 | Sirius | 41 | (2) |
| 2023–2024 | → Örgryte (loan) | 26 | (11) |
| 2024– | Landskrona BoIS | 56 | (21) |

International career
| 2017 | Sweden U17 | 3 | (0) |
| 2020 | Kosovo U21 | 2 | (0) |
- * Club domestic league appearances and goals as of 11 November 2026

Edi Sylisufaj (born 8 March 2000) is a professional footballer who plays as a forward for Swedish club Landskrona BoIS. Born in Sweden, he most recently represented Kosovo at youth level.

== Club career ==
=== Falkenberg ===
Sylisufaj as a six-year-old started playing football at Falkenberg. On 15 October 2016, he was named as a Falkenberg substitute for the first time in a Allsvenskan match against GIF Sundsvall. Eight days later, Sylisufaj became the first player born in the 21st century to play in the Allsvenskan after he made his debut in a 2–1 away defeat against Norrköping after coming on as a substitute at 89th minute in place of Enock Kwakwa. On 4 January 2017, Sylisufaj signed his first professional contract with first team of Falkenberg after agreeing to a three-year deal.

=== Sirius ===
==== Period as loaned ====
On 6 August 2021, Sylisufaj was loaned to Allsvenskan side Sirius until the end of the season. Three days later, he made his debut in a 0–0 away draw against Varbergs BoIS after coming on as a substitute at 75th minute in place of Christian Kouakou. Ten days after debut, Sylisufaj scored his first goal for Sirius in his third appearance for the club in a 3–2 away win over Täby in 2021–22 Svenska Cupen second round.

==== Return as a permanent player ====
On 3 January 2022, Sylisufaj signed a three-year contract with Allsvenskan club Sirius.

== International career ==
=== Sweden ===
==== Under-17 ====
On 30 January 2017, Sylisufaj received a call-up from Sweden U17 for friendly matches against Norway U17, Poland U17 and Czech Republic U17. Ten days later, he made his debut with Sweden U17 in a friendly match against Norway U17 after being named in the starting line-up.

=== Kosovo ===
On 17 July 2020, Zgjim Sojeva, manager of Kosovo U21 said that Sylisufaj, together with his teammate Lorik Ademi are in the process of adjusting the documentation and is expected to join the team during 2021. On 7 August 2020, the Football Federation of Kosovo announced that has started completing the necessary documents and if everything ended on time, Sylisufaj will be called up from Kosovo U21 in September 2020 for 2021 UEFA European Under-21 Championship qualification match against England U21, which did not happen due to problems with documentation.

On 2 October 2020, Sylisufaj received a call-up from Kosovo U21 for the 2021 UEFA European Under-21 Championship qualification matches against Austria U21 and Andorra U21. Seven days later, he made his debut with Kosovo U21 in a match against Austria U21 after coming on as a substitute at 52nd minute in place of Alban Ajdini.

== Personal life ==
Sylisufaj was born in Sweden to Albanian parents from Tropojë and Kosovo, he is expected to be the first player at Kosovo national teams that is originally from Albania.

== Career statistics ==
=== Club ===
As of 3 January 2022

| Club | Season | League | | | Cup | | Other | | Total | |
| Club | Season | Division | Apps | Goals | Apps | Goals | Apps | Goals | Apps | Goals |
|---|---|---|---|---|---|---|---|---|---|---|
| Falkenberg | 2016 | Allsvenskan | 3 | 0 | 2 | 0 | — | | 5 | 0 |
| Falkenberg | 2017 | Superettan | 5 | 2 | 1 | 0 | — | | 6 | 2 |
| Falkenberg | 2018 | Superettan | 6 | 0 | 4 | 1 | — | | 10 | 1 |
| Falkenberg | 2019 | Allsvenskan | 19 | 1 | 5 | 2 | — | | 24 | 3 |
| Falkenberg | 2020 | Allsvenskan | 25 | 7 | 3 | 0 | — | | 28 | 7 |
| Falkenberg | 2021 | Superettan | 12 | 1 | 0 | 0 | — | | 12 | 1 |
| Falkenberg | Total | | 70 | 11 | 15 | 3 | — | | 85 | 14 |
| Sirius | 2021 (loan) | Allsvenskan | 15 | 3 | 1 | 1 | — | | 16 | 4 |
| Sirius | 2022 | Allsvenskan | 0 | 0 | 0 | 0 | — | | 0 | 0 |
| Sirius | Total | | 15 | 3 | 1 | 1 | — | | 16 | 4 |
| Career total | | | 85 | 14 | 16 | 4 | — | | 101 | 18 |
