= Grebbestads IF =

Swedish football club

- Full name: Grebbestads Idrottsförening
- Nickname: GIF
- Founded: 1922
- Ground: Siljevi; Grebbestad; Sweden
- Chairman: Michael Torberntsson
- League: Division 2 Norra Götaland
- 2020: Division 2 Norra Götaland, 4th
Home colours

Grebbestads IF is a Swedish football club located in Grebbestad.

== Background ==
In 2012 Grebbestads IF won Division 4 Bohuslän/Dalsland which is the sixth tier of Swedish football. In 2013 they played – and won – the third division Northwest Gotaland. Currently (2017) they play in the second division which is the fourth tier of Swedish football. They play their home matches at the Siljevi in Grebbestad.

The club is affiliated to Bohusläns Fotbollförbund. Grebbestads IF have competed in the Svenska Cupen on 14 occasions and have played 29 matches in the competition.

== Notable players ==
Former Chelsea captain Dennis Wise played 10 games for the club in 1985.

Tobias Carlsson, David Edvardsson, and Gustav Henriksson all began their careers at the club and later played for teams in the Allsvenskan. David and Gustav also represented foreign clubs.

== Season to season ==
Season	Level	Division	Section	Position	Movements
1993	Tier 4	Division 3	Nordvästra Götaland	12th	Relegated
1994	Tier 5	Division 4	Bohuslän/Dalsland	2nd	Promotion Playoffs
1995	Tier 5	Division 4	Bohuslän/Dalsland	4th	Grebbestads IF/Tanums IF
1996	Tier 5	Division 4	Bohuslän/Dalsland	1st	Grebbestads IF/Tanums IF – Promoted
1997	Tier 4	Division 3	Nordvästra Götaland	6th	Grebbestads IF/Tanums IF
1998	Tier 4	Division 3	Nordvästra Götaland	7th	Grebbestads IF/Tanums IF
1999	Tier 4	Division 3	Nordvästra Götaland	3rd	
2000	Tier 4	Division 3	Nordvästra Götaland	6th	
2001	Tier 4	Division 3	Nordvästra Götaland	7th	
2002	Tier 4	Division 3	Nordvästra Götaland	12th	Relegated
2003	Tier 5	Division 4	Bohuslän/Dalsland	8th	
2004	Tier 5	Division 4	Bohuslän/Dalsland	1st	Promoted
2005	Tier 4	Division 3	Nordvästra Götaland	9th	
2006*	Tier 5	Division 3	Nordvästra Götaland	11th	Relegated
2007	Tier 6	Division 4	Bohuslän/Dalsland	8th	
2008	Tier 6	Division 4	Bohuslän/Dalsland	5th	
2009	Tier 6	Division 4	Bohuslän/Dalsland	9th	
2010	Tier 6	Division 4	Bohuslän/Dalsland	6th	
2011	Tier 6	Division 4	Bohuslän/Dalsland	6th	
2012	Tier 6	Division 4	Bohuslän/Dalsland	1st	Promoted
2013	Tier 5	Division 3	Nordvästra Götaland	1st	Promoted
2014	Tier 4	Division 2	Norra Götaland	4th	
2015	Tier 4	Division 2	Norra Götaland	3rd	
2016	Tier 4	Division 2	Norra Götaland	6th	
2017	Tier 4	Division 2	Norra Götaland	1st	Promoted
2018	Tier 3	Division 1	Södra	14th	Relegated
2019	Tier 4	Division 2	Norra Götaland	2nd	Promotion Playoffs
2020	Tier 4	Division 2	Norra Götaland	4th	
2021	Tier 4	Division 2	Norra Götaland	11th	

* League restructuring in 2006 resulted in a new division being created at Tier 3 and subsequent divisions dropping a level.
