= Mergim Laci =

Swedish footballer

Personal information
- Date of birth: 2 April 1998 (age 28)
- Place of birth: Sweden
- Height: 1.89 m (6 ft 2 in)
- Position: Midfielder

Team information
- Current team: Tvååkers IF
- Number: 16

Youth career
- Falkenbergs FF

Senior career*
| Years | Team | Apps | (Gls) |
| 2018–2019 | Falkenbergs FF | 8 | (0) |
| 2020–2021 | Tvååkers IF | 35 | (7) |
| 2022–2023 | Nordic United FC | 24 | (10) |
| 2024–2025 | BK Olympic | 40 | (7) |
| 2025– | Tvååkers IF | 33 | (25) |
- * Club domestic league appearances and goals as of 16 November 2026

Mergim Laci (born 2 April 1998) is a Swedish footballer who plays as a midfielder for Tvååkers IF.

== Career ==
Laci started playing in Getinge IF. He played for Rinia and Böljan before coming to Falkenbergs FF. He got his first team debut on 10 June 2018 in a 3–0 victory against Gefle IF. Laci was one out of six players who left the club at the end of 2019.

In 2020, he signed for Tvååkers IF. He left the club at the end of 2021.
