= Victor Karlsson =

Swedish footballer

Personal information
- Date of birth: 18 May 2001 (age 25)
- Height: 1.76 m (5 ft 9 in)
- Position: Midfielder

Team information
- Current team: Tvååkers IF
- Number: 13

Youth career
- Onsala BK

Senior career*
Years	Team	Apps	(Gls)
2018–2020	Onsala BK	42	(7)
2021–2023	Varbergs BoIS	52	(4)
2022	→ Norrby IF (loan)	9	(0)
2024–2025	Landskrona BoIS	52	(2)
2026–	Tvååkers IF	16	(1)

International career
2017	Sweden U16	2	(0)
- * Club domestic league appearances and goals as of 16 November 2026

Victor Karlsson (born 18 May 2001) is a Swedish professional footballer who plays as a midfielder for Tvååkers IF.

== Club career ==
On 5 January 2024, Karlsson signed a three-year contract with Landskrona BoIS.
