= Marko Atanackovic =

Swedish footballer

Personal information
- Date of birth: 13 May 1986 (age 40)
- Place of birth: Stockholm, Sweden
- Height: 1.83 m (6 ft 0 in)
- Position: Goalkeeper

Team information
- Current team: Assyriska FF
- Number: 51

Youth career
- Djurgårdens IF

Senior career*
Years	Team	Apps	(Gls)
2003–2004	Väsby United	2	(0)
2004	Djurgårdens IF	0	(0)
2005–2009	Arameisk-Syrianska IF	113	(0)
2010	Vasalunds IF	16	(0)
2011	Arameisk-Syrianska IF	12	(0)
2011	IK Sirius	0	(0)
2012	IK Frej	26	(0)
2013	Valsta Syrianska IK	5	(0)
2013–2018	IK Frej	109	(0)
2019	1. SC Znojmo FK	0	(0)
2019	Newroz FC	10	(0)
2019–2020	Panachaiki GE	5	(0)
2020	Sollentuna FK	0	(0)
2021	Segeltorps IF	11	(0)
2022–	Assyriska FF	50	(0)
- * Club domestic league appearances and goals as of 4 December 2024

Marko Atanackovic (born 13 May 1986) is a Swedish football goalkeeper who plays for Assyriska FF.

== Career ==
=== Club career ===
Brought up in Djurgårdens IF's system, the goalkeeper spent almost an entire career in lower leagues of Sweden. He played over 100 league games each for both Arameisk-Syrianska IF and IK Frej before finally getting a try at playing abroad. Signing for lowly Czech club 1. SC Znojmo FK, the contract was soon annulled due to irregularities with the player agent.

He played the spring season for another Swedish low-level club before moving to Greece in the summer of 2019. In the Super League Greece 2, he debuted in a fully professional league at the age of 33 for Panachaiki GE.

As the team imploded, he went home to Sweden again to join third-tier Sollentuna FK. In June 2020, Atanackovic was accused of playing large sums of money on matches he himself had played in. Atanackovic, however, denied the allegations, stating that he did not want to play in a club that came with false accusations against him and for that reason he left the club shortly after his arrival.
