= Salif Camara Jönsson =

Swedish footballer

Personal information
- Full name: Salif Mané Camara-Jönsson
- Date of birth: 9 September 1983 (age 43)
- Place of birth: Kulladal, Sweden
- Height: 1.90 m (6 ft 3 in)
- Position: Forward

Youth career
- Kirseberg IF

Senior career*
Years	Team	Apps	(Gls)
2006	Kirseberg IF	24	(12)
2007–2008	IF Limhamn Bunkeflo	36	(3)
2009–2011	FC Rosengård 1917	13	(5)
2012–2014	Lunds BK	71	(40)
2015–2020	Trelleborgs FF	135	(55)
- * Club domestic league appearances and goals

Salif Camara Jönsson (born 9 September 1983) is a Swedish former footballer who played as a forward.
