= AFC Eskilstuna =

Swedish association football club

- Full name: Athletic Football Club Eskilstuna
- Founded: 2007; 19 years ago (as "Athletic FC")
- Ground: Tunavallen, Eskilstuna
- Capacity: 7,800
- Chairman: Håkan Ringkvist
- Manager: Tony Andersson
- League: Ettan Norra
- 2025: Ettan Norra, 8th of 16
- Website: www.afc-eskilstuna.se
Home colours	Away colours

Athletic Football Club Eskilstuna, also known as AFC Eskilstuna or simply AFC, is a Swedish professional football club based in Eskilstuna. They compete in Ettan, the third highest tier of Swedish football, and play their home matches at Tunavallen. AFC Eskilstuna are affiliated to Södermanlands Fotbollförbund.

The club was formed in 2007 as Athletic FC and formed a close cooperation with FC Väsby United in 2012. Athletic FC replaced Väsby United in the league system the following year, forming AFC United. During the 2016 season it was once again decided that they would switch their name, identity, as well as locality. Choosing to move to Eskilstuna, about 110 kilometers west of Stockholm, they are since known as AFC Eskilstuna.

== Background ==
=== AFC United ===
AFC United was founded when FC Väsby United increased their cooperation Division 3 club Athletic FC in late 2012. They played their home matches at Skytteholms IP in Solna until the end of the 2016 season. Athletic FC was founded in 2007 and became part of AFC United in 2012. In 2012, Athletic FC played in Swedish football Division 3 Norra Svealand which is the fifth tier of Swedish football. Athletic FC was affiliated to Stockholms Fotbollförbund.

=== AFC Eskilstuna ===
During the 2016 season the club management decided to uproot and leave Solna and move to Eskilstuna and Tunavallen before the 2017 season. They also changed their name to AFC Eskilstuna.

The team were winless, having only acquired 4 points from the opening 12 matches and were firmly rooted to the bottom of the league table. Michael Jolley was announced as new manager on 13 June 2017. Under Jolley's coaching they took 15 points from the next 16 games. A 3–1 victory over Malmö FF on 19 August 2017 in particular provided the biggest shock of the season in Allsvenskan. However, they were eventually relegated to Superettan on 23 October 2017 following a spirited fight when Jönköpings Södra IF defeated Kalmar FF 2–0, meaning AFC Eskilstuna could no longer reach the qualifying position. Jolley departed ways with AFC Eskilstuna on 9 January 2018 by mutual consent, after being unable to agree on the future direction of the club.

On 15 January 2018, Nemanja Miljanović became the manager, after their relegation to the Superettan.

=== AFC Eskilstuna Academy ===
AFC Eskilstuna Academy was founded in 2017 and aims to develop young football talents from Eskilstuna and the surrounding regions. The academy is certified by Swedish Elite Football (Svensk Elitfotboll) with one star, indicating that it meets high standards in player development, coaching, and organizational structure. Under the leadership of acting academy director Faisal Hassan, player development is conducted in close collaboration with the club’s first team. Home matches for the academy teams are mainly played at Skogsängens IP.

The academy has also achieved international success in the Gothia Cup, winning in the following years:

2022: Victory in the B17 category after defeating Dalkurd FF 1–0 in the final.

2024: Victory in the P17 category after defeating Swindon Town FITC 2–0 in the final at Ullevi.

These achievements shows the academy’s success in their academy's staff for developing the youth players.

== Season-to-season ==
Season	Level	League	Pos
Athletic FC
2009	Tier 9	Division 7 Stockholm D	4th (Note: In 2010, Athletic FC took over the place of Atletico Husby FF in Division 4.)
2010	Tier 6	Division 4 Stockholm Norra	5th
2011	Tier 6	Division 4 Stockholm Norra	2nd (P)
2012	Tier 5	Division 3 Norra Svealand	6th (Note: In 2013, Athletic FC took over the place of FC Väsby United in Division 1.)
AFC United
2013	Tier 3	Division 1 Norra	10th
2014	Tier 3	Division 1 Norra	1st (P)
2015	Tier 2	Superettan	8th
2016	Tier 2	Superettan	2nd (P)
AFC Eskilstuna
2017	Tier 1	Allsvenskan	16th (R)
2018	Tier 2	Superettan	3rd (P)
2019	Tier 1	Allsvenskan	16th (R)
2020	Tier 2	Superettan	9th
2021	Tier 2	Superettan	9th
2022	Tier 2	Superettan	8th
2023	Tier 2	Superettan	16th (R)
2024	Tier 3	Ettan Norra	11th
2025	Tier 3	Ettan Norra	8th

== Players ==
=== Current squad ===
As of 4 September, 2026

Note: Flags indicate national team as defined under FIFA eligibility rules; some limited exceptions apply. Players may hold more than one non-FIFA nationality.

No.	Pos.	Nation	Player
1	GK	SWE	Kevin Dyplin
2	MF	SWE	Leond Mahmoud
5	DF	SWE	Taulant Parallangaj
6	DF	SWE	Oliver Blomdahl
7	FW	SWE	Lee Hanson
8	MF	SWE	Ibrahim Ahmed
9	FW	SWE	Albin Flodkvist
10	FW	SWE	Emanuel Chabo
11	FW	SWE	Robin Björkman
12	MF	SWE	Elias Rigö
13	GK	SWE	Valter Jonasson
15	MF	SWE	Umar Kurfi Amadi
16	MF	SWE	Sixten Sköldqvist

No.	Pos.	Nation	Player
17	MF	SWE	Efdon Mahari (on loan from BK Häcken)
19	DF	BIH	Amel Mazalovic
20	DF	SWE	Mohamed Youla
22	MF	SWE	Alexander Marauge
23	DF	SWE	Love Lindbäck
24	MF	RUS	Dmitriy Zhuravlev
25	MF	SWE	Vincent Lif
30	MF	GUI	Ibrahima Fofana
36	DF	SWE	Arvid Önnebro
37	GK	SWE	Sebastian Ekholm
55	DF	SWE	Melvin Rydh
68	DF	SWE	Filip Rogić
99	FW	SWE	Aleksandar Azizovic

=== Out on loan ===
Note: Flags indicate national team as defined under FIFA eligibility rules; some limited exceptions apply. Players may hold more than one non-FIFA nationality.

No.	Pos.	Nation	Player
26	MF	BDI	Lewis Nihorimbere (at Syrianska FC until 30 November 2026)

== Attendances ==
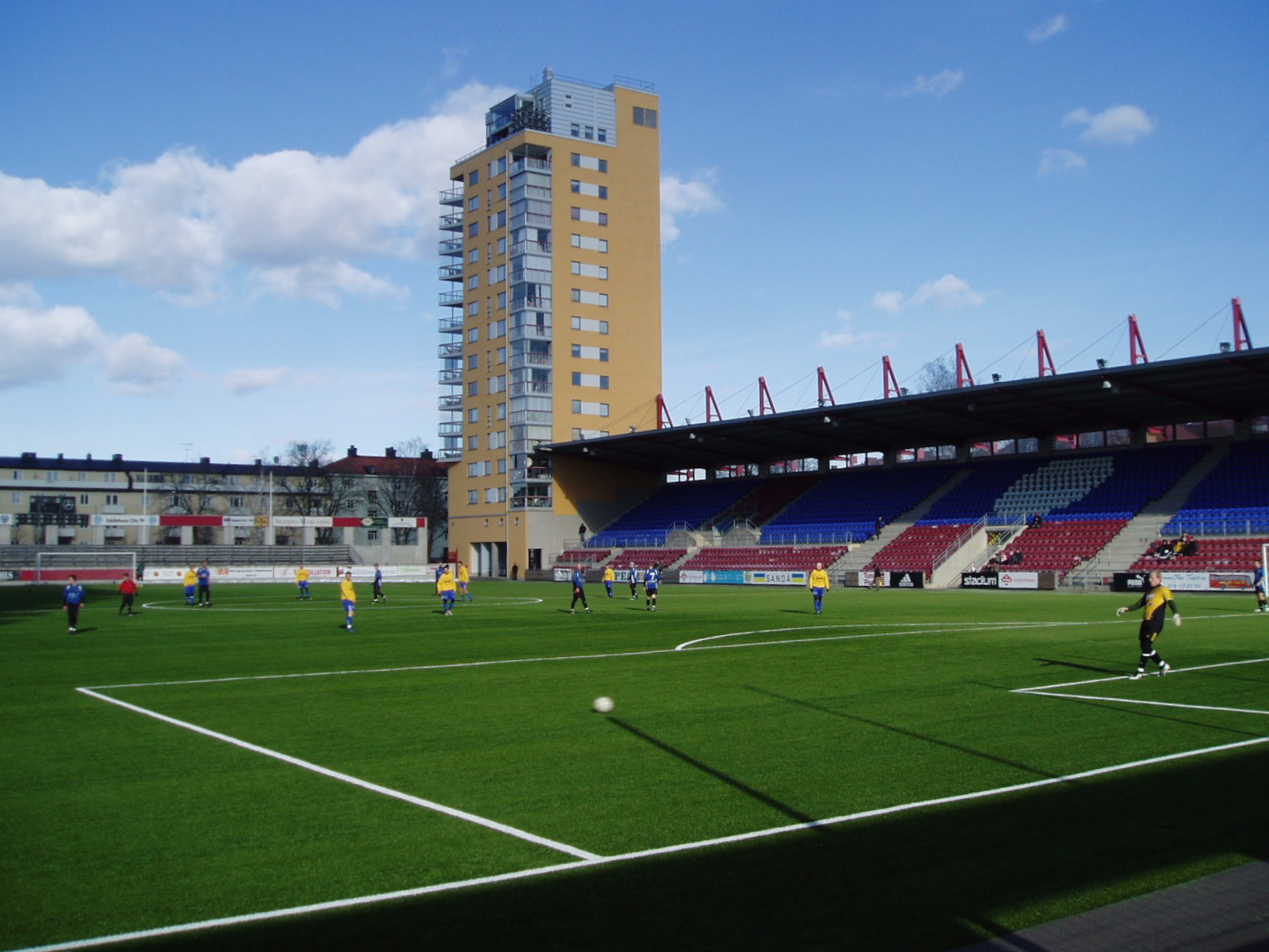
AFC Eskilstuna play their home games at Tunavallen

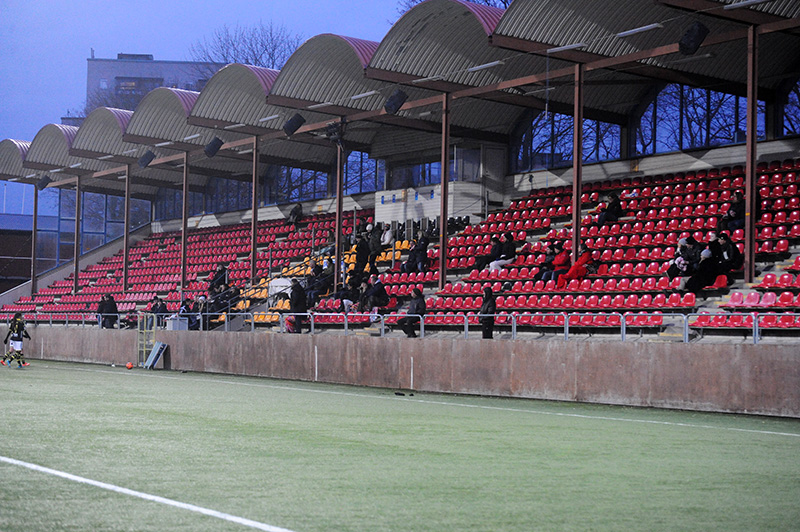
AFC United previously played their home games at Skytteholms IP

AFC Eskilstuna have had the following average attendances:

Season	Average attendance	Division / Section	Level
2013	179	Div 1 Norra	Tier 3
2014	176	Div 1 Norra	Tier 3
2015	346	Superettan	Tier 2
2016	698	Superettan	Tier 2

* Attendances are provided in the Publikliga sections of the Svenska Fotbollförbundet website.

== Achievements ==
=== League ===
- Superettan
  - Runners-up (1): 2016
- Division 1 Norra
  - Winners (1): 2014

=== Cup ===
- Svenska Cupen
  - Runners-up (1): 2019
