= Team TG FF =

Swedish football club

- Full name: Team ThorenGruppen Fotboll Förening
- Founded: 2014
- Ground: Umeå Energi Arena, Umeå; Sweden
- Capacity: 7,000
- Head coach: André Ghanbari
- League: Division 2
- 2025: Division 1 Norra, 16th
Home colours	Away colours

Team TG FF, also known as Team ThorenGruppen, is a Swedish football club located in Umeå, part of a sports club Team Thorengruppen. The club was founded in 2014. In 2015 the club took over Tegs SK FF, a secession of the senior team in Tegs SK.

== Background ==
Team Thorengruppen SK was founded in 2005 as a floorball club. Until 2014 the club was mainly associated with floorball. The football club is affiliated to the Västerbottens Fotbollförbund.

== Season to season ==
Season	Level	Division	Section	Position	Movements
2014	Tier 8	Division 6	Södra	1st	Promoted
2015	Tier 4	Division 2	Norrland	1st	Promoted
2016	Tier 3	Division 1	Norra	5th	
2017	Tier 3	Division 1	Norra	7th	
2018	Tier 3	Division 1	Norra	12th	

== Current squad ==
As of 31 August 2025

Note: Flags indicate national team as defined under FIFA eligibility rules; some limited exceptions apply. Players may hold more than one non-FIFA nationality.

No.	Pos.	Nation	Player
1	GK	SWE	Alex Jerner
2	DF	SWE	William Andersson-Junkka
4	DF	SWE	William Berglin
5	DF	SWE	William Rönnlund
6	DF	SWE	Hamed Mumand
7	MF	SWE	Alexandros Junghagen Pliatsikas
8	MF	FIN	Tyson Afshari
9	FW	SWE	Victor Kamf
11	MF	SWE	William Hansson
12	MF	SWE	Elvis Hansson (on loan from GIF Sundsvall)
13	GK	SWE	Albin Lidman
14	MF	DEN	Karim Bassam El-Khatib

No.	Pos.	Nation	Player
15	MF	SWE	Niklas Haglund
16	MF	SWE	Tintin Lindgren (on loan from Umea)
17	FW	SWE	Albin Näslund
18	DF	SWE	Tobias Sundström
19	FW	BDI	Lewis Nihorimbere
20	DF	SWE	Edvard Carrick (on loan from GIF Sundsvall)
21	DF	SWE	Anton Mossnelid (on loan from GIF Sundsvall)
22	DF	SWE	Jonathan Andreasson
27	DF	SWE	Isac Hedlund
34	FW	SWE	Philip Näslund
37	FW	SWE	Max Wolf-Watz
77	MF	SWE	Torre Rafael
80	MF	SWE	Júnior Gonçalves Karlstedt
