= Sollentuna FK =

Swedish football club

- Full name: Sollentuna Fotbollsklubb
- Founded: 2013
- Ground: Sollentunavallen, Sollentuna
- Capacity: 4,500
- Head coach: Douglas Jakobsen
- League: Ettan Norra
- 2025: 10th of 16
Home colours	Away colours

Sollentuna FK is a Swedish football club located in Sollentuna, a municipality in Stockholm County. The men's team currently competes in the Ettan Norra, the third division of Swedish football, and play their matches at Sollentunavallen.

== Background ==
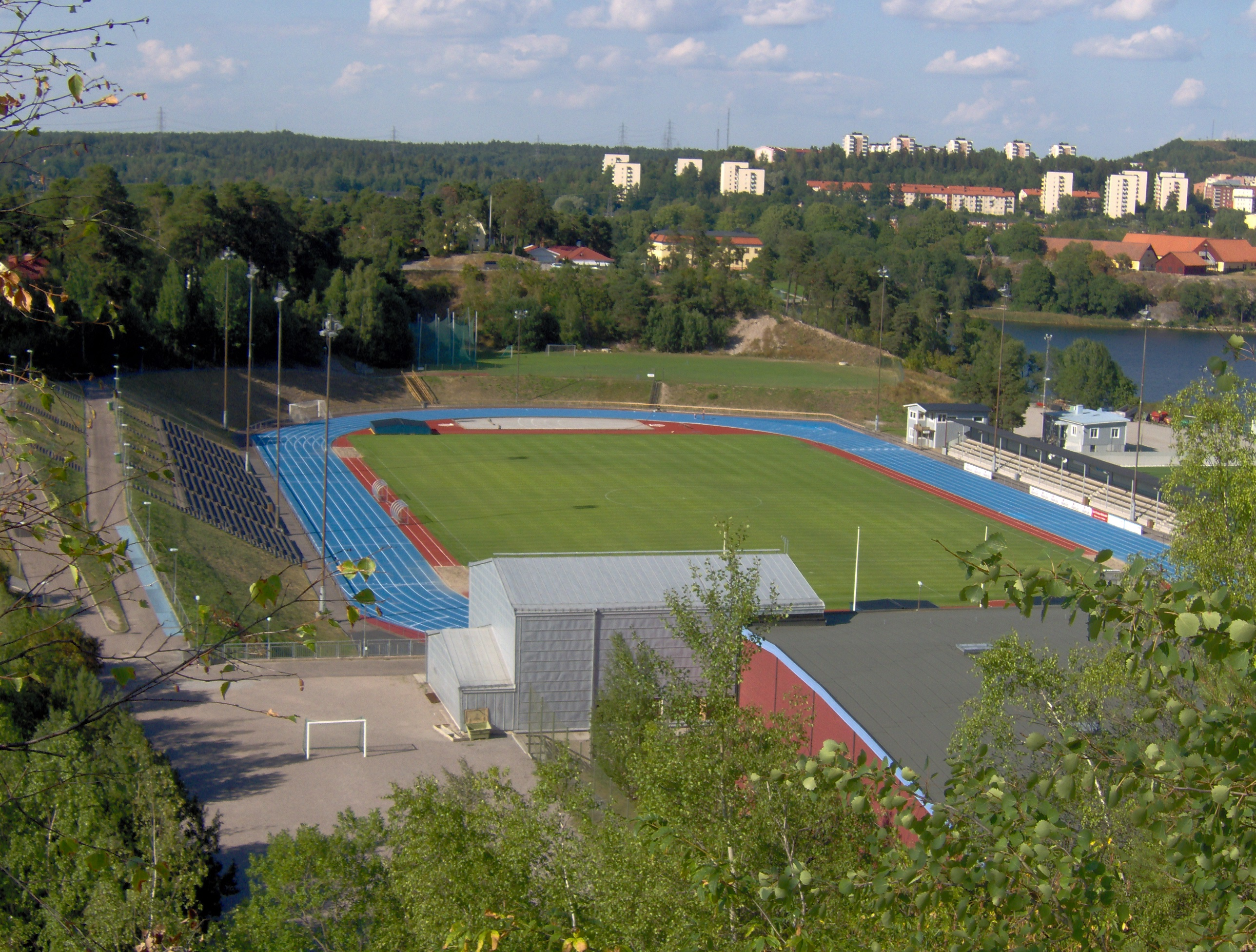
Sollentunavallen

Sollentuna United FF was founded in 2006 with the impending merger of Turebergs IF and Edsbergs IF which became operative in the 2008 season. Turebergs IF were promoted from Division 3 Norra Svealand in 2007 after winning their promotion playoff. The previous season in 2006 they won Division 4 Stockholm Norra. The new club took the place of Turebergs IF in Division 2 Norra Svealand for the 2008 season. In 2013 Sollentuna United FF merged with Sollentuna Fotboll IF to create Sollentuna FK.

Since their foundation, Sollentuna FK has participated in the middle tier of the Swedish football league system. The club currently plays in Division 1 Norra which is the third tier of Swedish football.

Sollentuna FK are affiliated to the Stockholms Fotbollförbund.

== Season to season ==
Season	Level	Division	Section	Position	Movements
2008	Tier 4	Division 2	Norra Svealand	3rd	
2009	Tier 4	Division 2	Norra Svealand	9th	
2010	Tier 4	Division 2	Norra Svealand	2nd	
2011	Tier 4	Division 2	Norra Svealand	5th	
2012	Tier 4	Division 2	Norra Svealand	2nd	
2013	Tier 4	Division 2	Norra Svealand	4th	
2014	Tier 4	Division 2	Norra Svealand	3rd	
2015	Tier 4	Division 2	Norra Svealand	3rd	
2016	Tier 4	Division 2	Norra Svealand	1st	Promoted
2017	Tier 3	Division 1	Norra	11th	
2018	Tier 3	Division 1	Norra	7th	
2019	Tier 3	Division 1	Norra	13th	Relegation Playoffs - Not Relegated
2024	Tier 3	Ettan	Norra	9th	
2025	Tier 3	Ettan	Norra	10th	

* League restructuring in 2006 resulted in a new division being created at Tier 3 and subsequent divisions dropping a level.

== Current squad ==
As of 4 September, 2026

Note: Flags indicate national team as defined under FIFA eligibility rules; some limited exceptions apply. Players may hold more than one non-FIFA nationality.

No.	Pos.	Nation	Player
1	GK	SWE	Oscar Franck
2	DF	SWE	Lukas Johansson
3	DF	SWE	Kalle Selin Stregart
4	DF	SWE	David Bengtsson
5	MF	SWE	Jonathan Zebarga
6	DF	SWE	Oskar Käck
7	MF	SWE	Jakob Bäckström
8	MF	SWE	Emil Stenstrand
9	FW	EST	Kristoffer Grauberg
10	MF	SWE	Dida Rashidi
11	FW	SWE	Salim Nkubiri
12	DF	SWE	Umit Aras
13	GK	SWE	Noah Nytén

No.	Pos.	Nation	Player
14	FW	SWE	Filip Rosenquist
15	DF	TUR	Benjamin Emre
16	MF	SWE	Noah Josefsberg
17	DF	SWE	Johannes Danho
18	MF	SWE	Erik Lundell
19	MF	SWE	Ludvig Ennart
20	MF	SWE	Angel Rubiño Huaiquio
21	MF	SWE	Wilgot Marshage
22	MF	ALB	Astrit Ajdarević
23	DF	TUN	Monir Jelassi
24	MF	SWE	Eddie Karlsson
27	DF	SWE	Charlie Axelsson
35	GK	SWE	Viktor Blumenthal
