= Robin Strömberg =

Swedish footballer

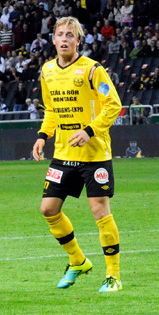

Personal information
- Date of birth: 23 January 1992 (age 34)
- Place of birth: Sweden
- Height: 1.84 m (6 ft 1/2 in)
- Position: Forward

Senior career*
Years	Team	Apps	(Gls)
2011–2014	Mjällby AIF	54	(4)
2012	→ Þór Akureyri (loan)	8	(3)
2015–2016	Östers IF	47	(11)
2017–2018	Ljungskile SK	55	(41)
2019–2021	Norrby IF	78	(22)

International career
2011	Sweden U19	1	(0)
- * Club domestic league appearances and goals as of 27 November 2021

Robin Strömberg (born 23 January 1992) is a Swedish footballer.

He played four years at Mjällby AIF and two seasons at Östers IF. During the 2012 season, Strömberg had a loan spell at Icelandic club Þór Akureyri, where he scored three goals in eight matches.
