= Joel Enarsson =

Swedish footballer

Personal information
- Full name: Joel Erling Enarsson
- Date of birth: 28 June 1993 (age 33)
- Place of birth: Sweden
- Height: 1.78 m (5 ft 10 in)
- Position: Forward

Team information
- Current team: FK Karlskrona
- Number: 16

Youth career
- 1997–2006: Märserums IF
- 2007–2009: Högadals IS
- 2011–2012: Mjällby AIF

Senior career*
| Years | Team | Apps | (Gls) |
| 2010 | Asarums IF | 20 | (7) |
| 2011–2013 | Mjällby AIF | 0 | (0) |
| 2013 | → Asarums IF (loan) | 22 | (21) |
| 2014 | Asarums IF | 16 | (12) |
| 2014 | Mjällby AIF | 7 | (2) |
| 2015–2016 | IFK Norrköping | 15 | (0) |
| 2016 | GIF Sundsvall | 5 | (0) |
| 2017 | Mjällby AIF | 24 | (7) |
| 2018– | FK Karlskrona | 0 | (0) |
- * Club domestic league appearances and goals as of 28 November 2017 (UTC)

Joel Enarsson (born 28 June 1993) is a Swedish footballer who plays as a forward for FK Karlskrona.
