= Rimnersvallen =

Sports venue in Uddevalla, Sweden

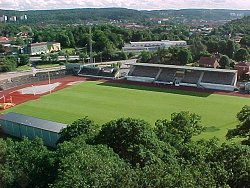
- Rimnersvallen
- Interactive map of Rimnersvallen
- Location: Uddevalla, Sweden
- Coordinates: 58°21′24″N 11°57′0″E
- Capacity: 10,605

Construction
- Groundbreaking: mid-1921
- Opened: 5 May 1923

Tenants
- IK Oddevold, Uddevalla IS

Rimnersvallen is a multi-use stadium in Uddevalla, Sweden. It is currently used mostly for football matches. The stadium holds 10,605 people.

The ground was opened on 5 May 1923 and was then rebuilt for the 1958 World Cup for which the stadium hosted two games. One of the World Cup matches played at Rimnersvallen was between Brazil and Austria. That game ended 3–0 to Brazil and was watched by 17,778 spectators, which remains the all-time attendance record for the venue.

Rimnersvallen is currently the home venue for IK Oddevold who play in Superettan.
