= Tvååkers IF =

Swedish football club

- Full name: Tvååkers Idrottsförening
- Founded: 1920; 106 years ago
- Ground: Övrevi IP, Tvååker, Sweden
- Capacity: 1,000
- Head coach: Mårten Lundqvist
- League: Ettan Södra
- 2026: Ettan Södra, 11th
Home colours	Away colours

Tvååkers IF is a Swedish football club located in Tvååker in Varberg Municipality, Halland County.

== Background ==
Since their foundation in 1920 Tvååkers IF has participated mainly in the middle and lower divisions of the Swedish football league system. The club currently plays in Division 1 which is the third tier of Swedish football. They play their home matches at Övrevi IP football ground in Tvååker.

Tvååkers IF are affiliated to the Hallands Fotbollförbund.

== Season to season ==
Season	Level	Division	Section	Position	Movements
1993	Tier 5	Division 4	Halland	8th	
1994	Tier 5	Division 4	Halland	1st	Promoted
1995	Tier 4	Division 3	Sydvästra Götaland	10th	Relegated
1996	Tier 5	Division 4	Halland	7th	
1997	Tier 5	Division 4	Halland	3rd	
1998	Tier 5	Division 4	Halland	9th	
1999	Tier 5	Division 4	Halland	3rd	
2000	Tier 5	Division 4	Halland	2nd	Promotion Playoffs
2001	Tier 5	Division 4	Halland	4th	
2002	Tier 5	Division 4	Halland	3rd	
2003	Tier 5	Division 4	Halland	7th	
2004	Tier 5	Division 4	Halland	5th	
2005	Tier 5	Division 4	Halland	5th	
2006*	Tier 6	Division 4	Halland	2nd	Promotion Playoffs – Promoted
2007	Tier 5	Division 3	Sydvästra Götaland	6th	
2008	Tier 5	Division 3	Sydvästra Götaland	5th	
2009	Tier 5	Division 3	Sydvästra Götaland	2nd	Promotion Playoffs
2010	Tier 5	Division 3	Sydvästra Götaland	2nd	Promotion Playoffs – Promoted
2011	Tier 4	Division 2	Västra Götaland	7th	
2012	Tier 4	Division 2	Södra Götaland	2nd	
2013	Tier 4	Division 2	Västra Götaland		

* League restructuring in 2006 resulted in a new division being created at Tier 3 and subsequent divisions dropping a level.

== Current squad ==
As of 8 September 2026

Note: Flags indicate national team as defined under FIFA eligibility rules; some limited exceptions apply. Players may hold more than one non-FIFA nationality.

No.	Pos.	Nation	Player
1	GK	SWE	Axel Svensson
2	DF	SWE	Gustav Bendrik
3	DF	SWE	Viggo Gustavsson (on loan from Varbergs BoIS)
4	DF	SWE	Viktor Nilsson
5	DF	SWE	Gabriel Gustavsson
6	MF	SWE	Lorik Ademi
7	MF	SWE	Felix Gustafsson
8	MF	SWE	Isak Wiman
9	FW	KOS	Alfred Ajdarević
10	MF	SWE	Liam Munther
11	MF	SWE	Melvin Sjöland
12	FW	SWE	Emmanuel Tannor

No.	Pos.	Nation	Player
13	MF	SWE	Victor Karlsson
14	MF	SWE	Mohanad Saeed
15	MF	SWE	Noe Lundgren (on loan from Sirius)
16	FW	SWE	Mergim Laci
18	MF	SWE	David Björnsson
19	FW	SWE	Ishak Shamoun
20	DF	SWE	Hugo Rödin
21	FW	SWE	Linus Cronvall
22	FW	SWE	Albin Johansson
24	MF	SWE	Theodor Graudums
30	GK	SWE	Max Kruse
35	GK	SWE	Alexander Nielsen

== Attendances ==
In recent seasons Tvååkers IF have had the following average attendances:

Season	Average attendance	Division / Section	Level
2006	Not available	Div 4 Halland	Tier 6
2007	209	Div 3 Sydvästra Götaland	Tier 5
2008	157	Div 3 Sydvästra Götaland	Tier 5
2009	189	Div 3 Sydvästra Götaland	Tier 5
2010	159	Div 3 Sydvästra Götaland	Tier 5
2011	306	Div 2 Västra Götaland	Tier 4

* Attendances are provided in the Publikliga sections of the Svenska Fotbollförbundet website.
