= Tvååker =

- Location within Halland Location within Sweden
- Coordinates: 57°03′N 12°24′E
- Country: Sweden
- Province: Halland
- County: Halland County
- Municipality: Varberg Municipality

Area
  - Total: 2.23 km^{2} (0.86 sq mi)

Population (31 December 2010)
  - Total: 2,534
  - Density: 1,134/km^{2} (2,940/sq mi)
- Time zone: UTC+1 (CET)
  - Summer (DST): UTC+2 (CEST)

Tvååker is the second largest locality situated in Varberg Municipality, Halland County, Sweden, with 2,534 inhabitants in 2010. It is located about 15 km south-east of Varberg.

== Name ==
The actual name Tvååker could be translated as twofield (or twoacre). But it is instead a corruption of the name Toaker (1198). The word to has been interpreted as flax, i.e. "flax field".

== Education ==
The village has a lower secondary school, Bosgårdsskolan as well as an upper secondary school, Munkagårdsgymnasiet, which is focused on animal care, agriculture, forestry and landscaping.

== Sport ==
The football team, Tvååkers IF was formed in 1920 and has a male team for the first time as high as 2nd league and a joint female team with Galtabäck in the 5th league. A floorball-team, Tvååkers IBK, was formed in 1986 and played in the top league for two seasons in the early 1990s.

Other sports clubs located in Tvååker include:

- Galtabäcks BK

== People from Tvååker ==
- Sven Nylander
- Svante Grände
