= Arena Oskarshamn (football venue) =

Football stadium in Oskarshamn, Sweden

Coordinates: 57.2561°N 16.4816°E

Arena Oskarshamn is a football stadium in Oskarshamn, Sweden and the home stadium for the football team Oskarshamns AIK. Arena Oskarshamn has a total capacity of 2,000 spectators.
