= Nordic United FC =

Swedish football club

Nordic United
- Full name: Nordic United Football Club
- Founded: 2004; 22 years ago 2020; 6 years ago (refounded)
- Ground: Södertälje Fotbollsarena
- Chairman: Iso Gürsac
- Head coach: Steven Younan
- League: Superettan
- 2025: Ettan Norra, 1st of 16 (promoted)
Home colours	Away colours

Nordic United FC is a Swedish professional football club located in Södertälje. They currently play in Superettan, the second tier of Swedish football, after promotion from Ettan in 2025.

== History ==
Nordic United was founded in 2004 as Assyriska FF Babylon. Changes in identity have been the norm in recent years with the club being known as Södertälje FC, Assyriska United IK, Södertälje FK / Assyriska United IK, United IK and United IK Nordic. In 2013, the club took over the team Assyriska Botkyrka (the youth team of Assyriska FF) and played for many years after that in Botkyrka. In 2022, the club changed its name to Nordic United FC.

After finishing 2nd in the 2023 Ettan Norra, Nordic United contested the playoff for promotion to 2024 Superettan, but lost to Örgryte.

In the 2025 season, Nordic United secured promotion to Superettan for the first time in their history from next season after finishing 1st in Ettan Norra and becoming champions in the third tier.

== Players ==
=== Current squad ===
As of 1 September 2026

Note: Flags indicate national team as defined under FIFA eligibility rules; some limited exceptions apply. Players may hold more than one non-FIFA nationality.

No.	Pos.	Nation	Player
1	GK	SWE	Angelo Melkemichel
2	DF	SYR	Matteus Behnan
3	DF	PAK	Mohammad Fazal
4	DF	NOR	Liiban Abadid
5	DF	SWE	Elias Andersson
6	MF	SWE	Gabriel Aphrem
7	MF	SWE	Amar Eminovic
8	MF	SWE	Teo Grönborg
9	FW	SWE	Shergo Shhab
10	FW	SWE	Elias Durmaz
11	FW	SWE	Adi Fisic
12	DF	SYR	Sammi Davis

No.	Pos.	Nation	Player
16	MF	SWE	Nhome Daneyl
17	MF	SWE	Alexander Lindgren (on loan from Degerfors IF)
18	FW	SWE	Ninos Issa
20	FW	SWE	Aziz Harabi
21	MF	SWE	Emanuel Swedi
24	DF	SWE	Theodor Johansson
30	GK	SWE	William Eskelinen
35	GK	SWE	Fahad Ghazala
40	GK	SWE	Amar Dževlan (on loan from Mjällby)
74	FW	SWE	Christian Aphrem
77	DF	SWE	Jonathan Gürsac

=== Out on loan ===
Note: Flags indicate national team as defined under FIFA eligibility rules; some limited exceptions apply. Players may hold more than one non-FIFA nationality.

No.	Pos.	Nation	Player
