= Södertälje Fotbollsarena =

Football stadium in Södertälje, Sweden

Coordinates: 59.18756°N 17.57043°E

- Jalla-Vallen eller Jallavalla
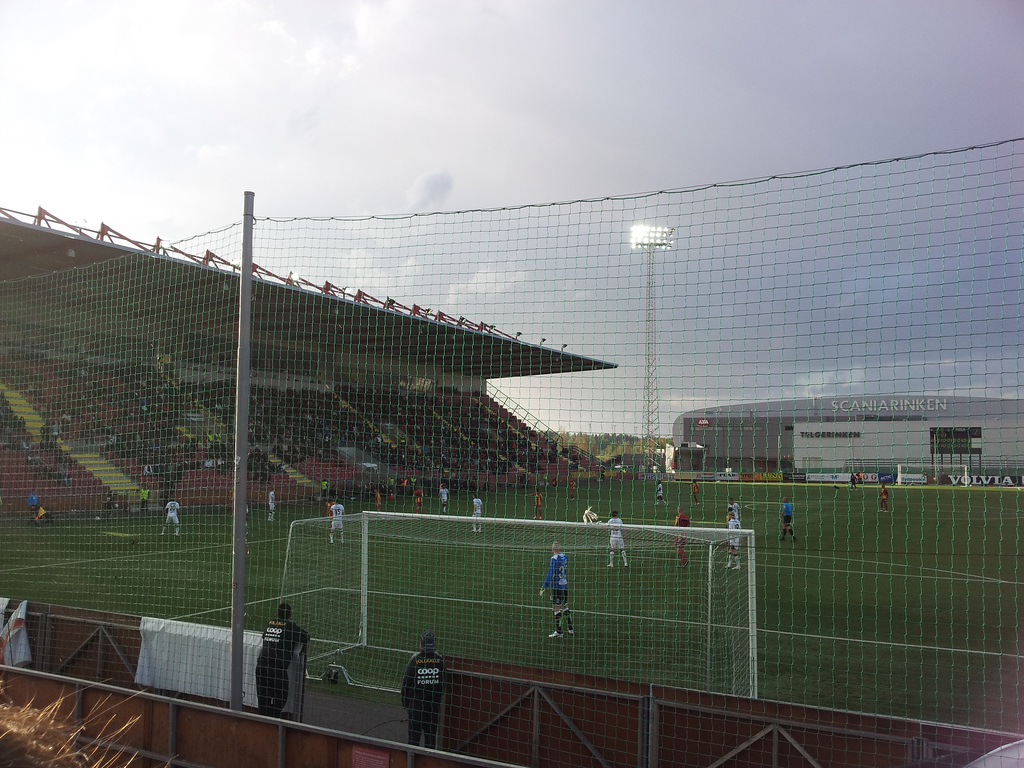
- The stadium on a matchday
- Interactive map of Södertälje Fotbollsarena
- Full name: Södertälje Fotbollsarena
- Location: Geneta, Södertälje, Sweden
- Owner: Södertälje kommun
- Operator: Södertälje kommun, förenings- och idrottsenheten
- Capacity: 6,400 (football)
- Surface: Artificial turf
- Field size: 105 m × 68 m (344 ft × 223 ft)

Construction
- Built: 2005
- Opened: November 2005
- Renovated: July 2008
- Cost: 12 million €

Tenants
- Assyriska FF (2006–); Syrianska FC (2006–); Nordic United FC

Website
- https://www.sodertalje.se/kultur-och-fritid/boka-idrottsanlaggning/anlaggningsregister/sodertalje-fotbollsarena/

Södertälje Fotbollsarena is a multipurpose stadium in Södertälje, Sweden. It is currently used mostly for football matches and is the home stadium of Assyriska FF, Syrianska FC and Nordic United FC. The stadium holds 6,400 people and was built in 2005.

== Average attendances ==
Season	Assyriska	Tier	Syrianska	Tier
2006	1,664	2	946	3
2007	2,178	3	1,535	3
2008	2,863	2	1,754	3
2009	2,801	2	2,286	2
2010	2,282	2	2,687	2
2011	2,319	2	2,852	1
2012	1,924	2	2,453	1
2013	1,975	2	2,443	1
2014	1,901	2	1,809	2
