= 2012–13 Svenska Cupen =

Tournament details
- Country: Sweden
- Dates: 3 June 2012 – 26 May 2013
- Teams: 103 (including qualifying); 96 (competition proper)

Final positions
- Champions: IFK Göteborg (6th title)
- Runners-up: Djurgårdens IF

Tournament statistics
- Matches played: 119
- Goals scored: 403 (3.39 per match)
- Top goal scorer: Tobias Hysén (8 goals)

The 2012–13 Svenska Cupen was the 57th season of Svenska Cupen and the first season since 2000–01 to be held according to the fall-spring season format. The season also reintroduced a group stage, the first since 1995–96.

A total of 96 clubs entered the competition. The first round commenced on 3 June 2012 and the final was contested on 26 May 2013 at Friends Arena in Solna. Helsingborgs IF were the defending champions, having beaten Kalmar FF 3–1 in last season's final.

IFK Göteborg won their sixth Svenska Cupen title on 26 May 2013 after defeating Djurgårdens IF 3–1 on penalties after the match had finished 1–1 after extra time.

== Teams ==
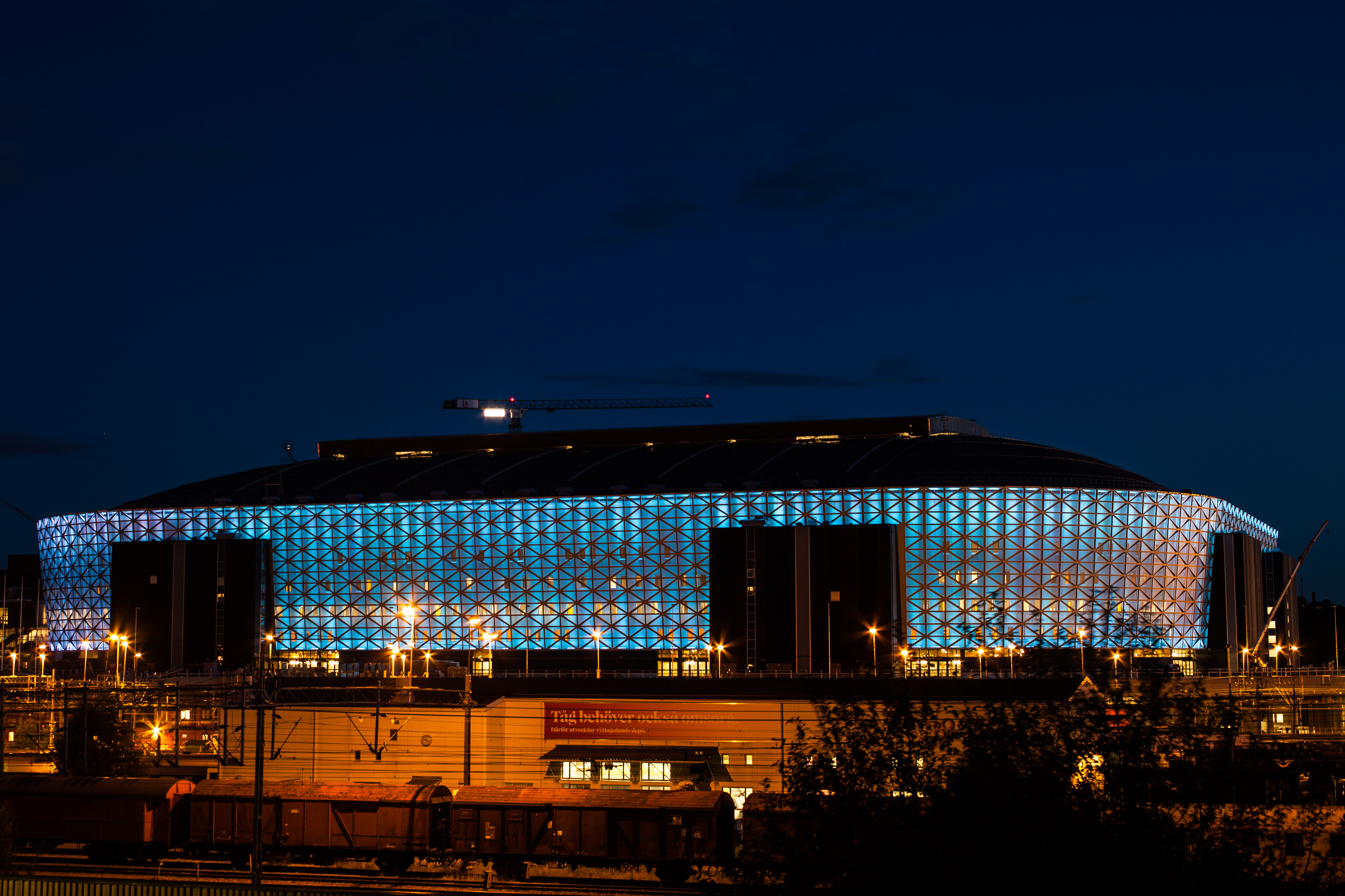
Friends Arena, Solna - venue for the 2012–13 Svenska Cupen final

Round	Clubs remaining	Clubs involved	Winners from previous round	New entries this round	Leagues entering at this round
Qualifying rounds	103	8	none	8	Division 1 (1 team); Division 2 (1 team); Division 3 (2 teams); Division 4 (3 teams); Division 6 (1 teams)
Round 1	96	64	1	63	Division 1 (15 teams); Division 2 (17 teams); Division 3 (17 teams); Division 4 (12 teams); Division 5 (2 teams)
Round 2	64	64	32	32	Allsvenskan; Superettan
Group stage	32	32	32	none	none
Quarter-finals	8	8	8	none	none
Semi-finals	4	4	4	none	none
Final	2	2	2	none	none

== Qualifying rounds ==
The only one of the Swedish District Football Associations that had a qualifying round was Dalarnas FF, the other ones decided their teams in other ways. The first round commenced on 3 March 2012 and the final was contested on 22 May 2012.

== Round 1 ==
64 teams from the third tier or lower of the Swedish league system competed in this round. The round was played between 3 June and 5 August 2012 with the majority of the fixtures played in early August.

3 June 2012	Enhörna IF	1–4	Långholmen FC	Södertälje
16:00	Lundberg 20'	Report	O'Sullivan 11', 81'; Harkness 52'; Mbaroodi Sowe 78'	Stadium: Friluftsgården; Attendance: Unknown; Referee: Markus Guldbrandsson (Eskilstuna)

6 June 2012	FOC Farsta	1–3	IK Frej	Stockholm
19:00	Faye Ahlqvist 10'	Report	Tedengren 9', 56' (pen.); Wiklundh 84'	Stadium: Farsta IP; Attendance: 50; Referee: Mohammad Dabestani (Solna)

27 June 2012	Husqvarna FF	1–2	IK Sleipner	Huskvarna
19:00	Ritheim 35'	Report	Miljevic 4'; Haddad 26'	Stadium: Vapenvallen; Attendance: Unknown; Referee: Levente Szasz (Ljungby)

2 July 2012	Azech SF	0–3	Hovslätts IK	Norrköping
19:00		Report	Malki 67'; Karlsson 80'; Portocarrero Linares 83'	Stadium: Idrottsparken (Södra); Attendance: 78; Referee: Patric Nyrenvall (Linköping)

21 July 2012	IFK Berga	1–2	Ronneby BK	Kalmar
14:00	Holm 59'	Report	Hellblad 39'; Petersson 76'	Stadium: Bergaviks IP; Attendance: 201; Referee: Marico Svilenko (Växjö

21 July 2012	Salsåker-Ullångers IF	1–2	Selånger FK	Ullånger
15:00	Tanurcov 78'	Report	Nyman 52'; Widahl 80'	Stadium: Kinavallen; Attendance: 125; Referee: Ulrik Ulander (Husum)

23 July 2012	IFK Mariestad	1–2	Motala AIF	Mariestad
19:00	Fredén 41' (pen.)	Report	Svärd 27'; Magnusson Glaad 86'	Stadium: Lekevi IP; Attendance: 140; Referee: Per Rehnlund (Hålanda)

28 July 2012	Kvibille BK	1–3	Torns IF	Kvibille
14:00	Jarälv 21'	Report	Nilsson 3'; Grönevik 59'; Rendin 74'	Stadium: Björkevi IP; Attendance: 122; Referee: Henrik Hall (Falkenberg)

28 July 2012	IFK Fjärås	2–3	Ramlösa Södra FF	Fjärås
15:00	Salomonsson 67'; Eriksson 72'	Report	Rajabieh Fard 84'; Nicklasson Lantz 87'; Vahlgren 90'	Stadium: Ögärdets IP; Attendance: 170; Referee: Andreas Wanjura (Lindome)

29 July 2012	Lerkils IF	0–6	IFK Uddevalla	Vallda
16:00		Report	Andreasson 17', 27', 31'; Bagger 38'; Abed-Al-Mouti 90', 90'	Stadium: Ledets IP; Attendance: Unknown; Referee: Johan Lindvig (Halmstad)

31 July 2012	Oxie IF	4–6 (a.e.t.)	Åkarps IF	Oxie
19:00	Månsson 47'; Almqvist 79'; Gil 87'; Thorisson 100'	Report	Zejnullahu 30', 117', 120'; Johansson 38'; Emanuelsson 90'; Silfverberg Folkesson 112'	Stadium: Oxie IP; Attendance: 107; Referee: Jesper Persson (Malmö)

31 July 2012	Skepplanda BTK	0–4	Lärje-Angereds IF	Skepplanda
19:00		Report	Ehiorobo 2'; Dzafic 38'; Ahmet Sammar 40'; Zlotea 62'	Stadium: Forsvallen; Attendance: Unknown; Referee: Niklas Nyberg (Torslanda)

1 August 2012	Furulunds IK	0–3	Kristianstads FF	Furulund
19:00		Report	Nilsson 4', 77'; Ahmeti 27'	Stadium: Ljungvalla IP; Attendance: 60; Referee: Niklas Andersson (Malmö)

1 August 2012	FC Höllviken	2–1	IF Limhamn Bunkeflo	Höllviken
19:00	Persson 83' (pen.); Enarsson 88'	Report	Karim 6'	Stadium: Höllviken IP; Attendance: 100; Referee: Namik Idrizovic (Malmö)

1 August 2012	Ölmstads IS	2–4	Dalstorps IF	Ölmstad
19:00	Wreland 2'; Björk 64' (pen.)	Report	Magnusson 20', 25', 52', 90'	Stadium: ÖIS Gården; Attendance: 300; Referee: Julian Poulsen Sosefo (Växjö)

1 August 2012	IK Arvika	1–1 (a.e.t.) (0–3 p)	Rynninge IK	Arvika
19:00	Berntsson 88'	Report	Henriksson 63'	Stadium: Solviksvallen; Attendance: Unknown; Referee: Johan Owén (Karlskoga)
	Penalties
	Penalty missed		(penalty scored) Malm; (penalty scored) Pers; (penalty scored) Forsberg; (penalty missed) Jatko

1 August 2012	Guldhedens IK	1–2	Råslätts SK	Gothenburg
19:00	Sassi 65' (pen.)	Report	Ibrahim 28'; Vukojevic 85'	Stadium: Apelsinplan; Attendance: 50; Referee: Marcus Lundgren (Gothenburg)

1 August 2012	Ljungby IF	0–2	Skövde AIK	Ljungby
19:00		Report	Olsson 45', 85'	Stadium: Lagavallen; Attendance: 187; Referee: Victor Wolf (Jönköping)

1 August 2012	Nyköpings BIS	1–0	FC Väsby United	Nyköping
19:00	da Silva Rosa 58'	Report		Stadium: Rosvalla IP; Attendance: 250; Referee: Johan Fält (Enköping)

1 August 2012	Arameiska-Syrianska Botkyrka IF	3–2	Vasalunds IF	Botkyrka
19:00	Ostojic 38'; Genc 45', 74'	Report	Johansson 4'; Eid 35'	Stadium: Brunna IP; Attendance: Unknown; Referee: Björn Särnbrink (Segeltorp)

1 August 2012	Edsbyns IF	0–5	Östersunds FK	Edsbyn
19:00		Report	Accam 20', 53'; Sollander Jansson 56'; Nordin 70'; Perman 77'	Stadium: Öns IP; Attendance: 170; Referee: Mohamed Nablsi (Gävle)

1 August 2012	IFK Västerås	2–3 (a.e.t.)	Enskede IK	Västerås
19:30	Rodin 3', 90'	Report	Ståhl 26'; Gidlund 48'; 97' (o.g.)	Stadium: Swedbank Park; Attendance: Unknown; Referee: Joakim Östling (Västerås)

1 August 2012	Sollentuna United	1–3 (a.e.t.)	IK Sirius	Sollentuna
19:30	Nador 90'	Report	Sosseh 85', 120'; Gustafsson 119'	Stadium: Sollentunavallen; Attendance: Unknown; Referee: Jonas Bäcklund (Solna)

2 August 2012	Falu FK	0–2	Sandvikens IF	Falun
19:00		Report	Berglund 21'; Stillmark 33'	Stadium: Kopparvallen; Attendance: 250; Referee: Patrik Almkvist (Örebro)

3 August 2012	IFK Falköping	1–3	Örgryte IS	Falköping
19:00	Westerberg 31'	Report	Hedman 66', 89'; Wallén 87'	Stadium: Odenplan; Attendance: 325; Referee: Fredrik Olsson (Dalsjöfors)

3 August 2012	Valsta Syrianska IK	2–1	Akropolis IF	Märsta
19:00	Ike 27', 41'	Report	Katenda 68'	Stadium: Midgårdsvallen; Attendance: 102; Referee: Metin Yildirim (Södertälje)

4 August 2012	IK Sturehov	0–2 (a.e.t.)	Karlstad BK	Örebro
15:00		Report	Noajnas 100'; Nilsson 105'	Stadium: Sörbyvallen; Attendance: Unknown; Referee: Alexander Milovanovic (Västerås)

4 August 2012	Melleruds IF	0–1	Utsiktens BK	Mellerud
15:00		Report	Jevtic 12'	Stadium: Rådavallen; Attendance: 130; Referee: Ulrik Hedfjärd (Falköping)

5 August 2012	Ärentuna SK	0–3	FC Gute	Uppsala
12:00		Report	Cuckovic 27'; Nobell 36' (pen.); Sandberg 42'	Stadium: Ärentuna IP; Attendance: 100; Referee: Pontus Orebrand (Östhammar)

5 August 2012	Kiruna FF	1–2	Mariehem SK	Kiruna
13:00	Mannela 44'	Report	Lundmark 4'; Larsson 45'	Stadium: Lombia IP; Attendance: 65; Referee: Per Anders Blind (Luleå)

5 August 2012	Torslanda IK	1–0	FC Trollhättan	Gothenburg
15:00	62' (o.g.)	Report		Stadium: Torslandavallen; Attendance: Unknown; Referee: Haris Memisevic (Gothenburg)

5 August 2012	Ängö BK	1–1 (a.e.t.) (3–5 p)	IFK Hässleholm	Kalmar
17:00	Marku 35'	Report	Svensson 20'	Stadium: Fredriksskans; Attendance: 150; Referee: Martin Brandt (Värnamo)
	Penalties
	(penalty scored) Nielsen; (penalty scored) Bergström; (penalty scored) Conradsson		(penalty scored) Eriksson; (penalty scored) Waldemarsson; (penalty scored) Gunnarsson; (penalty scored) Andersson; (penalty scored) Xaba

== Round 2 ==
All teams from 2012 Allsvenskan and 2012 Superettan entered in this round, 32 teams in total, where they were joined by the 32 winners from round 1. The 32 teams from Allsvenskan and Superettan were seeded and played against the 32 winners from round 1, the matches were played at the home venues for the unseeded teams. The fixtures were drawn on 6 August 2012 and the round was initially scheduled to be played between 16 and 20 August 2012, however three fixtures were postponed to later dates due to clashes with Allsvenskan and European cup play.

16 August 2012	IK Sirius	1–1 (a.e.t.) (4–3 p)	Hammarby IF	Uppsala
19:00	Sosseh 45'	Report	Ayrancı 67'	Stadium: Studenternas IP; Attendance: Unknown; Referee: Tobias Mattsson (Karlstad)
	Penalties
	Björkebaum (penalty scored); Skoglund (penalty scored); Käck (penalty scored); Nyström (penalty scored)		(penalty scored) Husidić; (penalty scored) Ayrancı; (penalty scored) Adelstam; (penalty missed) Schuler; (penalty missed) Törnstrand

18 August 2012	IK Frej	2–1	Trelleborgs FF	Täby
14:00	Ledezma Pimentel 26'; Draganov 66'	Report	Jovanović 56'	Stadium: Vikingavallen; Attendance: 423; Referee: Johan Thalin (Storvreta)

18 August 2012	Enskede IK	0–1	Landskrona BoIS	Stockholm
14:00		Report	Zaim 16'	Stadium: Enskede IP; Attendance: 349; Referee: Stefan Johannesson (Stocksund)

18 August 2012	Lärje-Angereds IF	1–1 (a.e.t.) (2–3 p)	Östers IF	Gothenburg
14:00	Hamzeh 42'	Report	Blomqvist-Zampi 40'	Stadium: Bläsebovallen; Attendance: 274; Referee: Bojan Pandzić (Gothenburg)
	Penalties
	Prince Ehiorobo (penalty scored); Hamzeh (penalty scored); Alushaj (penalty missed); Yildirim (penalty missed); Radonić (penalty missed)		(penalty scored) Velić; (penalty scored) Söderberg; (penalty missed) Bergholtz; (penalty scored) Wihlborg

18 August 2012	Kristianstads FF	1–2	Falkenbergs FF	Kristianstad
15:00	Kelechi Omeonu 48'	Report	Sköld 13', 53'	Stadium: Kristianstads IP; Attendance: Unknown; Referee: Nermin Cisić (Värnamo)

18 August 2012	IFK Uddevalla	0–7	Syrianska FC	Uddevalla
15:00		Report	Ibrahim 8'; Felić 40'; Hegeland 45' (o.g.); Touma 47', 52'; Brändén 81' (o.g.); Mourad 83'	Stadium: Kamratgården; Attendance: 350; Referee: Glenn Nyberg (Borlänge)

18 August 2012	Ronneby BK	2–5	Halmstads BK	Ronneby
15:00	Petersson 8', 34'	Report	Antonsson 4'; Wrele 20'; Boman 75', 86'; Steindórsson 83'	Stadium: Brunnsvallen; Attendance: Unknown; Referee: Levente Szasz (Ljungby)

18 August 2012	Nyköpings BIS	5–3 (a.e.t.)	IF Brommapojkarna	Nyköping
15:00	Jansson 36'; Karlsson 61' da Silva Rosa 90'; Torres 116'; Zaldivar Funes 118'	Report	Corr Nyang 18'; Piñones Arce 19'; Lindner 54'	Stadium: Rosvalla IP; Attendance: Unknown; Referee: Dragan Banjać (Haninge)

18 August 2012	IFK Hässleholm	0–2	Umeå FC	Hässleholm
15:30		Report	Sennström 45'; Mårtensson 59'	Stadium: Österås IP; Attendance: Unknown; Referee: Kaspar Sjöberg (Malmö)

18 August 2012	Ramlösa Södra FF	0–7	Assyriska FF	Helsingborg
16:00		Report	Thorstensson 13', 73', 78'; Hyseni 38'; Laitinen 51'; Makdessi 69'; Ćatović 83'	Stadium: Heden IP; Attendance: 121; Referee: Michel Ekberg (Helsingborg)

18 August 2012	Östersunds FK	0–3	Mjällby AIF	Östersund
16:00		Report	Ekenberg 41'; 44' (o.g.); Agardius 89'	Stadium: Jämtkraft Arena; Attendance: 2,461; Referee: Niklas Abrahamsson (Sollefteå)

18 August 2012	Rynninge IK	0–2	IFK Norrköping	Örebro
16:00		Report	Nyman 30'; Þorvaldsson 50'	Stadium: Grenadjärvallen; Attendance: 423; Referee: Mohammed Al-Hakim (Köping)

18 August 2012	Karlstad BK	0–0 (a.e.t.) (3–4 p)	Gefle IF	Karlstad
16:00		Report		Stadium: Tingvalla IP; Attendance: 276; Referee: Andreas Svahn (Karlskoga)
	Penalties
	Wennberg (penalty scored); Gunnarsson (penalty missed); Mårtensson (penalty scored); Irineu de Souza (penalty scored); Noajnas (penalty missed); Bahtiri (penalty missed)		(penalty scored) Dahlberg; (penalty scored) Faltsetas; (penalty missed) Bernhardsson; (penalty missed) Malmborg; (penalty scored) E. Larsson; (penalty scored) Portin

18 August 2012	Arameiska-Syrianska Botkyrka IF	1–3	GIF Sundsvall	Stockholm
17:00	Charbel Georges 27'	Report	Holster 1', 66'; Dibba 54'	Stadium: Brunna IP; Attendance: Unknown; Referee: Johan Hamlin (Bro)

18 August 2012	Valsta Syrianska IK	0–1	IK Brage	Märsta
18:00		Report	Nilsson 18'	Stadium: Midgårdsvallen; Attendance: Unknown; Referee: Björn Särnbrink (Huddinge)

19 August 2012	Selånger FK	0–6	Ljungskile SK	Sundsvall
13:00		Report	Runnemo 71', 86', 89'; Hopkins 83'; Mikaelsson 85'; Iglicar 90'	Stadium: Selånger IP; Attendance: 450; Referee: Patrik Eriksson (Gävle)

19 August 2012	Mariehem SK	0–2	Örebro SK	Umeå
15:00		Report	Yasin 27', 50'	Stadium: T3 Arena; Attendance: Unknown; Referee: Lars Olsson (Umeå)

19 August 2012	Torns IF	1–2	Ängelholms FF	Lund
16:00	D. Thulin 78' (pen.)	Report	Andersen 29'; Staaf 85' (pen.)	Stadium: Tornvallen; Attendance: 599; Referee: Kristoffer Karlsson (Helsingborg)

19 August 2012	Motala AIF	1–2	Varbergs BoIS	Motala
16:00	Terbunja 53'	Report	Levi 18'; Sjöhage 35'	Stadium: Motala Idrottspark; Attendance: 698; Referee: Magnus Ahlsén (Linköping)

19 August 2012	Skövde AIK	0–3	Åtvidabergs FF	Skövde
17:00		Report	Möller 9'; Prodell 38', 39'	Stadium: Södermalms IP; Attendance: 590; Referee: Antti Kanerva (Olofstorp)

19 August 2012	Örgryte IS	3–0	Degerfors IF	Gothenburg
17:00	Wallén 12', 69'; Lycén 63'	Report		Stadium: Gamla Ullevi; Attendance: 1,706; Referee: Robert Daradić (Helsingborg)

19 August 2012	Råslätts SK	2–3	IFK Värnamo	Jönköping
17:00	Glavas 21'; Vukojević 23'	Report	Zlojutro 45' (pen.); Claesson 78'; Abdulrahman 90+1'	Stadium: Råslätts IP; Attendance: 467; Referee: Jonas Karlsson (Målilla)

19 August 2012	Åkarps IF	0–3	BK Häcken	Åkarp
17:00		Report	Majeed 18', 69'; Ericsson 34'	Stadium: Åkarps IP; Attendance: 572; Referee: Andreas Ekberg (Lund)

19 August 2012	Utsiktens BK	0–3	GAIS	Gothenburg
17:00		Report	Aubynn 66' (pen.); Tornblad 71'; Olsson 79'	Stadium: Ruddalens IP; Attendance: 1,123; Referee: Mattias Nyman (Kungsbacka)

19 August 2012	IK Sleipner	0–2 (a.e.t.)	Jönköpings Södra IF	Norrköping
18:00		Report	Cederqvist 99', 106'	Stadium: Idrottsparken; Attendance: 174; Referee: Jim Petersson (Motala)

20 August 2012	Dalstorps IF	1–5	Djurgårdens IF	Dalstorp
18:00	J. Arnesson 43' (pen.)	Report	Fejzullahu 24', 45'; Hämäläinen 37', 75'; Nymann 77'	Stadium: Dalshov; Attendance: 1,538; Referee: Michael Lerjéus (Skövde)

20 August 2012	FC Gute	0–4	Kalmar FF	Visby
18:30		Report	Andersson 12', 77'; Eriksson 72'; Dauda 74'	Stadium: Gutavallen; Attendance: 1,041; Referee: Ozan Camlibel (Hägersten)

20 August 2012	Långholmen FC	0–9	IFK Göteborg	Stockholm
19:00		Report	Söder 13'; Salomonsson 17', 87'; Sobralense 34', 56'; Bärkroth 45'; Moberg Karlsson 49'; Gerzić 83'; Farnerud 90'	Stadium: Grimsta IP; Attendance: 670; Referee: Jonas Bäcklund (Solna)

20 August 2012	Sandvikens IF	3–6 (a.e.t.)	Malmö FF	Sandviken
19:00	Vigren 43'; Sipuri 55'; Berglund 60'	Report	Ranégie 3', 87'; Rantie 76', 110', 117'; Figueiredo 116'	Stadium: Jernvallen; Attendance: 2,700; Referee: Markus Strömbergsson (Gävle)

12 September 2012	Torslanda IK	0–1	AIK	Gothenburg
17:30		Report	Lundberg 38'	Stadium: Torslandavallen; Attendance: 1,023; Referee: Magnus Lindgren (Gothenburg)

11 November 2012	FC Höllviken	1–2	Helsingborgs IF	Höllviken
13:00	Hansen 37'	Report	Santos 41', 56'	Stadium: Höllviken IP; Attendance: 1,300; Referee: Daniel Stålhammar (Landskrona)

11 November 2012	Hovslätts IK	0–4	IF Elfsborg	Jönköping
13:30		Report	J. Larsson 13'; Elm 27'; Hedlund 54'; Hiljemark 80' (pen.)	Stadium: Hovet; Attendance: 1,079; Referee: Mikael Eriksson (Huskvarna)

== Group stage ==
The 32 winners from round 2 were divided into eight groups of four teams. The 16 highest ranked winners from the previous rounds were seeded to the top two positions in each groups and the 16 remaining winners were unseeded in the draw. The ranking of the 16 seeded teams were decided by league position in the 2012 season. All teams in the group played each other once, the highest ranked teams from the previous rounds and lower tier teams had the right to play two home matches. The group stage was played in March 2013. The draw for the group stage was held on 13 November 2012.

=== Tie-breaking criteria and key ===
If two or more teams are equal on points on completion of the group matches, the following criteria are applied to determine the rankings

1. superior goal difference
2. higher number of goals scored
3. result between the teams in question
4. higher league position in the 2012 season

=== Group 1 ===
Pos	Team	Pld	W	D	L	GF	GA	GD	Pts	Qualification	IKS	IFE	GAIS	LSK
1	IK Sirius	3	2	0	1	9	4	+5	6 (Note: IK Sirius were placed above IF Elfsborg based on their head-to-head record (2–1).)	Advance to Knockout stage	—	2–1	0–2	—
2	IF Elfsborg	3	2	0	1	9	4	+5	6		—	—	3–1	5–1
3	GAIS	3	2	0	1	5	4	+1	6		—	—	—	2–1
4	Ljungskile SK	3	0	0	3	3	14	−11	0		1–7	—	—	—

Notes:

2 March 2013 Matchday 1	IF Elfsborg	5–1	Ljungskile SK	Borås
14:00	J. Larsson 23'; Nilsson 31' (pen.); Mobaeck 54'; Rohdén 77'; Jørgensen 85'	Report	Johannesson 7'	Stadium: Borås Arena; Attendance: 670; Referee: Bojan Pandzić (Gothenburg)

2 March 2013 Matchday 1	IK Sirius	0–2	GAIS	Uppsala
17:00		Report	Augustsson 13'; B. Andersson 18'	Stadium: Lötens IP; Attendance: Unknown; Referee: Martin Strömbergsson (Gävle)

9 March 2013 Matchday 2	IK Sirius	2–1	IF Elfsborg	Uppsala
14:00	Käck 7'; Björkebaum 54'	Report	Hedlund 62'	Stadium: Lötens IP; Attendance: 1,250; Referee: Tobias Mattsson (Karlstad)

9 March 2013 Matchday 2	GAIS	2–1	Ljungskile SK	Gothenburg
15:00	Tornblad 34'; Abdulrahman 45'	Report	Johannesson 26'	Stadium: Valhalla IP; Attendance: 1,150; Referee: Antti Kanerva (Olofstorp)

16 March 2013 Matchday 3	Ljungskile SK	1–7	IK Sirius	Ljungskile
14:00	Sinclair 5'	Report	Björkebaum 30', 36', 68', 88'; Gustafsson 44', 45', 81'	Stadium: Markbygg Arena; Attendance: Unknown; Referee: Nermin Cisić (Värnamo)

17 March 2013 Matchday 3	IF Elfsborg	3–1	GAIS	Borås
16:00	Rohdén 68'; Lans 70'; Nilsson 77' (pen.)	Report	Johansson 69'	Stadium: Borås Arena; Attendance: 2,000; Referee: Michael Lerjéus (Skövde)

=== Group 2 ===
Pos	Team	Pld	W	D	L	GF	GA	GD	Pts	Qualification	FFF	BKH	ÖSK	IFKV
1	Falkenbergs FF	3	3	0	0	7	2	+5	9	Advance to Knockout stage	—	—	—	4–1
2	BK Häcken	3	2	0	1	6	2	+4	6		1–2	—	2–0	—
3	Örebro SK	3	1	0	2	2	3	−1	3		0–1	—	—	2–0
4	IFK Värnamo	3	0	0	3	1	9	−8	0		—	0–3	—	—

2 March 2013 Matchday 1	BK Häcken	1–2	Falkenbergs FF	Gothenburg
12:00	Ericsson 48'	Report	Sköld 64'; A. Wede 69'	Stadium: Valhalla IP; Attendance: 457; Referee: Kristoffer Karlsson (Malmö)

2 March 2013 Matchday 1	Örebro SK	2–0	IFK Värnamo	Örebro
14:00	Hasani 22'; Claesson 47' (o.g.)	Report		Stadium: Behrn Arena; Attendance: 1,012; Referee: Glenn Nyberg (Borlänge)

9 March 2013 Matchday 2	IFK Värnamo	0–3	BK Häcken	Värnamo
14:00		Report	El Kabir 18', 74'; Mohammed 49'	Stadium: Finnvedsvallen; Attendance: Unknown; Referee: Andreas Ekberg (Lund)

9 March 2013 Matchday 2	Örebro SK	0–1	Falkenbergs FF	Örebro
15:00		Report	A. Wede 63'	Stadium: Behrn Arena; Attendance: 842; Referee: Michael Lerjéus (Skövde)

13 March 2013 Matchday 3	Falkenbergs FF	4–1	IFK Värnamo	Falkenberg
15:00	Rodevåg 1', 4' (pen.); Johansson 51'; Sköld 53'	Report	Henningsson 23'	Stadium: Kristineslätt IP; Attendance: Unknown; Referee: Antti Kanerva (Olofstorp)

16 March 2013 Matchday 3	BK Häcken	2–0	Örebro SK	Gothenburg
16:00	Ericsson 5'; El Kabir 58'	Report		Stadium: Valhalla IP; Attendance: 400; Referee: Antti Kanerva (Olofstorp)

=== Group 3 ===
Pos	Team	Pld	W	D	L	GF	GA	GD	Pts	Qualification	ÖIF	MFF	IKF	GIFS
1	Östers IF	3	2	1	0	8	1	+7	7	Advance to Knockout stage	—	—	5–0	—
2	Malmö FF	3	2	1	0	7	2	+5	7		1–1	—	—	4–1
3	IK Frej	3	1	0	2	2	8	−6	3		—	0–2	—	2–1
4	GIF Sundsvall	3	0	0	3	2	8	−6	0		0–2	—	—	—

2 March 2013 Matchday 1	Malmö FF	1–1	Östers IF	Malmö
15:00	Rexhepi 25'	Report	Robledo 32'	Stadium: Malmö Stadion; Attendance: 4,531; Referee: Andreas Ekberg (Lund)

2 March 2013 Matchday 1	IK Frej	2–1	GIF Sundsvall	Solna
16:00	Draganov 15'; Kamara 63'	Report	Sliper 4'	Stadium: Skytteholms IP; Attendance: 400; Referee: Johan Krantz (Uppsala)

9 March 2013 Matchday 2	GIF Sundsvall	0–2	Östers IF	Sundsvall
14:00		Report	Söderberg 9'; Velić 27'	Stadium: Norrporten Arena; Attendance: Unknown; Referee: Martin Strömbergsson (Gävle)

10 March 2013 Matchday 2	IK Frej	0–2	Malmö FF	Solna
17:00		Report	Hamad 70'; Kroon 78'	Stadium: Skytteholms IP; Attendance: 1,178; Referee: Glenn Nyberg (Borlänge)

14 March 2013 Matchday 3	Östers IF	5–0	IK Frej	Växjö
19:00	Zlojutro 12'; Söderberg 48'; Pavey 71'; Persson 77', 80'	Report		Stadium: Växjö Tipshall; Attendance: 1,400; Referee: Robert Daradić (Helsingborg)

16 March 2013 Matchday 3	Malmö FF	4–1	GIF Sundsvall	Malmö
16:00	Pękalski 23'; Johansson 27', 90+2'; Eriksson 85'	Report	Walker 44'	Stadium: Limhamns IP; Attendance: 1,345; Referee: Bojan Pandzić (Gothenburg)

=== Group 4 ===
Pos	Team	Pld	W	D	L	GF	GA	GD	Pts	Qualification	ÖIS	HBK	AIK	SFC
1	Örgryte IS	3	2	0	1	7	4	+3	6	Advance to Knockout stage	—	—	4–1	2–1
2	Halmstads BK	3	2	0	1	5	4	+1	6		2–1	—	—	—
3	AIK	3	1	0	2	4	6	−2	3		—	1–2	—	2–0
4	Syrianska FC	3	1	0	2	3	5	−2	3		—	2–1	—	—

3 March 2013 Matchday 1	AIK	1–2	Halmstads BK	Solna
13:00	Goitom 81' (pen.)	Report	Selaković 4'; Magyar 11'	Stadium: Skytteholms IP; Attendance: 3,753; Referee: Johan Hamlin (Bro)

3 March 2013 Matchday 1	Örgryte IS	2–1	Syrianska FC	Gothenburg
16:00	E. Karlsson 77'; Lindström 87' (pen.)	Report	Felić 42'	Stadium: Valhalla IP; Attendance: 977; Referee: Magnus Ahlsén (Linköping)

10 March 2013 Matchday 2	Örgryte IS	4–1	AIK	Gothenburg
17:00	Wallén 5', 71'; E. Karlsson 36'; Leinar 59'	Report	Quaison 72'	Stadium: Valhalla IP; Attendance: 1,126; Referee: Kristoffer Karlsson (Malmö)

10 March 2013 Matchday 2	Syrianska FC	2–1	Halmstads BK	Södertälje
17:00	Chanko 58'; Svärd 90+4'	Report	Antonsson 56'	Stadium: Södertälje Fotbollsarena; Attendance: 500; Referee: Johan Hamlin (Bro)

16 March 2013 Matchday 3	Halmstads BK	2–1	Örgryte IS	Halmstad
13:00	Liverstam 75'; Rojas 77'	Report	Lindström 34' (pen.)	Stadium: Skedalaheds IP; Attendance: 614; Referee: Magnus Ahlsén (Linköping)

16 March 2013 Matchday 3	AIK	2–0	Syrianska FC	Solna
16:00	Igboananike 25', 80'	Report		Stadium: Skytteholms IP; Attendance: 1,850; Referee: Markus Strömbergsson (Gävle)

=== Group 5 ===
Pos	Team	Pld	W	D	L	GF	GA	GD	Pts	Qualification	IFKN	MAIF	LBIS	ÄFF
1	IFK Norrköping	3	2	1	0	6	0	+6	7	Advance to Knockout stage	—	2–0	0–0	—
2	Mjällby AIF	3	1	1	1	4	3	+1	4		—	—	3–0	1–1
3	Landskrona BoIS	3	1	1	1	3	4	−1	4		—	—	—	3–1
4	Ängelholms FF	3	0	1	2	2	8	−6	1		0–4	—	—	—

2 March 2013 Matchday 1	IFK Norrköping	0–0	Landskrona BoIS	Norrköping
13:00		Report		Stadium: Idrottsparken; Attendance: 1,400; Referee: Stefan Johannesson (Täby)

2 March 2013 Matchday 1	Mjällby AIF	1–1	Ängelholms FF	Karlshamn
14:00	Ekenberg 37'	Report	Staaf 32'	Stadium: Asarums IP; Attendance: 400; Referee: Martin Hansson (Holmsjö)

9 March 2013 Matchday 2	Mjällby AIF	3–0	Landskrona BoIS	Karlshamn
14:00	Pode 62'; Ekenberg 68', 90' (pen.)	Report		Stadium: Asarums IP; Attendance: 402; Referee: Robert Daradić (Helsingborg)

10 March 2013 Matchday 2	Ängelholms FF	0–4	IFK Norrköping	Helsingborg
14:00		Report	Smedberg Dalence 3'; Nyman 29', 81'; Wiklander 35'	Stadium: Hedens IP; Attendance: Unknown; Referee: Nermin Cisić (Värnamo)

16 March 2013 Matchday 3	IFK Norrköping	2–0	Mjällby AIF	Norrköping
13:00	Gerson 9'; Telo 70'	Report		Stadium: Idrottsparken; Attendance: 1,085; Referee: Johan Hamlin (Bro)

16 March 2013 Matchday 3	Landskrona BoIS	3–1	Ängelholms FF	Landskrona
15:00	Olsson 52'; Nilsson 56'; Tkacz 60'	Report	Asanovski 73'	Stadium: Landskrona IP; Attendance: Unknown; Referee: Jim Petersson (Motala)

=== Group 6 ===
Pos	Team	Pld	W	D	L	GF	GA	GD	Pts	Qualification	HIF	GIF	AFF	VBIS
1	Helsingborgs IF	3	2	1	0	9	2	+7	7	Advance to Knockout stage	—	3–1	1–1	—
2	Gefle IF	3	2	0	1	9	6	+3	6		—	—	5–1	3–2
3	Assyriska FF	3	0	2	1	3	7	−4	2		—	—	—	1–1
4	Varbergs BoIS	3	0	1	2	3	9	−6	1		0–5	—	—	—

2 March 2013 Matchday 1	Gefle IF	3–2	Varbergs BoIS	Gävle
16:00	Mård 27'; Dahlberg 67', 71'	Report	Sağlık 28', 78'	Stadium: Strömvallen; Attendance: Unknown; Referee: Mohammed Al-Hakim (Köping)

3 March 2013 Matchday 1	Helsingborgs IF	1–1	Assyriska FF	Helsingborg
16:00	Bedoya 41'	Report	Hellquist 66'	Stadium: Olympia; Attendance: 3,493; Referee: Antti Kanerva (Olofstorp)

10 March 2013 Matchday 2	Varbergs BoIS	0–5	Helsingborgs IF	Varberg
14:00		Report	Sadiku 16'; Lindström 55' (pen.); C. Andersson 71', 85' (pen.); Bedoya 80'	Stadium: Övrevi IP; Attendance: 731; Referee: Bojan Pandzić (Gothenburg)

10 March 2013 Matchday 2	Gefle IF	5–1	Assyriska FF	Gävle
17:00	Orlov 35', 37', 56'; Dahlberg 50', 54'	Report	Malmborg 21'	Stadium: Strömvallen; Attendance: 327; Referee: Lars Olsson (Umeå)

17 March 2013 Matchday 3	Assyriska FF	1–1	Varbergs BoIS	Södertälje
16:00	Özdemirok 19' (o.g.)	Report	Peter 52'	Stadium: Södertälje Fotbollsarena; Attendance: Unknown; Referee: Mohammed Al-Hakim (Köping)

17 March 2013 Matchday 3	Helsingborgs IF	3–1	Gefle IF	Helsingborg
16:00	Accam 18', 90+4'; Santos 61'	Report	Dahlberg 47'	Stadium: Olympia; Attendance: 2,817; Referee: Martin Hansson (Holmsjö)

=== Group 7 ===
Pos	Team	Pld	W	D	L	GF	GA	GD	Pts	Qualification	IFKG	KFF	IKB	NBIS
1	IFK Göteborg	3	2	0	1	6	2	+4	6	Advance to Knockout stage	—	0–1	2–0	—
2	Kalmar FF	3	2	0	1	5	2	+3	6		—	—	3–0	—
3	IK Brage	3	1	0	2	3	6	−3	3		—	—	—	3–1
4	Nyköpings BIS	3	1	0	2	4	8	−4	3		1–4	2–1	—	—

2 March 2013 Matchday 1	IFK Göteborg	2–0	IK Brage	Gothenburg
16:00	Hysén 3', 73'	Report		Stadium: Valhalla IP; Attendance: 2,118; Referee: Michael Lerjéus (Skövde)

3 March 2013 Matchday 1	Nyköpings BIS	2–1	Kalmar FF	Nyköping
15:00	Svensson 14'; Funes 50'	Report	Diouf 30'	Stadium: Rosvalla IP; Attendance: Unknown; Referee: Lars Olsson (Umeå)

10 March 2013 Matchday 2	Nyköpings BIS	1–4	IFK Göteborg	Nyköping
15:00	Funes 23'	Report	Hysén 8' (pen.), 75', 82'; Allansson 87'	Stadium: Rosvalla IP; Attendance: 1,428; Referee: Magnus Ahlsén (Linköping)

10 March 2013 Matchday 2	Kalmar FF	3–0	IK Brage	Kalmar
15:00	Andersson 24', 90'; Romarinho 38'	Report		Stadium: Gasten IP; Attendance: 240; Referee: Martin Hansson (Holmsjö)

16 March 2013 Matchday 3	IK Brage	3–1	Nyköpings BIS	Borlänge
13:00	Nilsson 56'; Moldskred 73'; Kapčević 82'	Report	Funes 54'	Stadium: Domnarvsvallen; Attendance: Unknown; Referee: Dragan Banjac (Haninge)

17 March 2013 Matchday 3	IFK Göteborg	0–1	Kalmar FF	Gothenburg
16:00		Report	Romarinho 66'	Stadium: Valhalla IP; Attendance: 1,838; Referee: Martin Strömbergsson (Gävle)

=== Group 8 ===
Pos	Team	Pld	W	D	L	GF	GA	GD	Pts	Qualification	DIF	ÅFF	JSIF	UFC
1	Djurgårdens IF	3	2	1	0	7	2	+5	7	Advance to Knockout stage	—	—	3–1	3–0
2	Åtvidabergs FF	3	1	1	1	5	4	+1	4		1–1	—	3–1	—
3	Jönköpings Södra IF	3	1	0	2	5	6	−1	3		—	—	—	3–0
4	Umeå FC	3	1	0	2	2	7	−5	3		—	2–1	—	—

3 March 2013 Matchday 1	Åtvidabergs FF	3–1	Jönköpings Södra IF	Åtvidaberg
14:00	Dogbé 81'; Pettersson 83'; Prodell 90' (pen.)	Report	Kangaskolkka 60'	Stadium: Kopparvallen; Attendance: 873; Referee: Jim Petersson (Motala)

3 March 2013 Matchday 1	Djurgårdens IF	3–0	Umeå FC	Stockholm
15:00	Fejzullahu 34' (pen.), 60' (pen.), 67'	Report		Stadium: Grimsta IP; Attendance: 1,800; Referee: Markus Strömbergsson (Gävle)

10 March 2013 Matchday 2	Umeå FC	2–1	Åtvidabergs FF	Umeå
15:00	Lidberg 58'; Fjällström Winka 76'	Report	Prodell 90'	Stadium: T3 Arena; Attendance: 333; Referee: Dragan Banjac (Haninge)

10 March 2013 Matchday 2	Djurgårdens IF	3–1	Jönköpings Södra IF	Stockholm
17:00	Johansson 52'; Solignac 66'; Fejzullahu 79'	Report	Thelin 75'	Stadium: Grimsta IP; Attendance: 967; Referee: Mohammed Al-Hakim (Köping)

16 March 2013 Matchday 3	Jönköpings Södra IF	3–0	Umeå FC	Jönköping
17:00	Karlsson 34'; Kangaskolkka 36'; Gojani 69'	Report		Stadium: Elmiahallen; Attendance: 205; Referee: Glenn Nyberg (Borlänge)

17 March 2013 Matchday 3	Åtvidabergs FF	1–1	Djurgårdens IF	Åtvidaberg
16:00	Prodell 20'	Report	Oyal 52'	Stadium: Kopparvallen; Attendance: 1,453; Referee: Jonas Eriksson (Sigtuna)

== Knockout stage ==
=== Qualified teams ===
Pos	Grp	Team	Pld	W	D	L	GF	GA	GD	Pts	Qualification
1	2	Falkenbergs FF	3	3	0	0	7	2	+5	9	Seeded in Quarter-final draw
2	6	Helsingborgs IF	3	2	1	0	9	2	+7	7	Seeded in Quarter-final draw
3	3	Östers IF	3	2	1	0	8	1	+7	7	Seeded in Quarter-final draw
4	5	IFK Norrköping	3	2	1	0	6	0	+6	7	Seeded in Quarter-final draw
5	8	Djurgårdens IF	3	2	1	0	7	2	+5	7	Unseeded in Quarter-final draw
6	1	IK Sirius	3	2	0	1	9	4	+5	6	Unseeded in Quarter-final draw
7	7	IFK Göteborg	3	2	0	1	6	2	+4	6	Unseeded in Quarter-final draw
8	4	Örgryte IS	3	2	0	1	7	4	+3	6	Unseeded in Quarter-final draw

Source: Group results
Rules for classification: 1) Points; 2) Goal difference; 3) Number of goals scored; 4) Highest ranked team

=== Bracket ===
Quarter-finals
4 April – Norrköping
IFK Norrköping	0 (4)
Djurgårdens IF (p)	0 (5)
3 April – Växjö
Falkenbergs FF	0
Örgryte IS	1
4 April – Växjö
Östers IF	2
IK Sirius	1
3 April – Helsingborg
Helsingborgs IF	0
IFK Göteborg	1

Semi-finals
1 May – Stockholm
Djurgårdens IF	1
Örgryte IS	0
1 May – Växjö
Östers IF	1
IFK Göteborg	4

Final
26 May – Solna
Djurgårdens IF	1 (1)
IFK Göteborg (p)	1 (3)

=== Quarter-finals ===
The quarter-finals were played on 3 and 4 April 2013 and consisted of the eight teams that won their respective group in the previous round. The four best group winners were entitled to play the match at their home venue. The draw for the quarter-finals took place on 17 March 2013, with IK Sirius from Division 1 remaining as the lowest-ranked team.

3 April 2013	Helsingborgs IF	0–1	IFK Göteborg	Helsingborg
18:00		Report	Haglund 4'	Stadium: Olympia; Attendance: 4,031; Referee: Tobias Mattsson (Karlstad)

3 April 2013	Falkenbergs FF	0–1	Örgryte IS	Växjö
18:00		Report	Wallén 50'	Stadium: Växjö Tipshall; Attendance: 350; Referee: Kristoffer Karlsson (Malmö)

4 April 2013	IFK Norrköping	0–0 (a.e.t.) (4–5 p)	Djurgårdens IF	Norrköping
17:30		Report		Stadium: Idrottsparken; Attendance: 2,306; Referee: Martin Strömbergsson (Gävle)
	Penalties
	Þorvaldsson (penalty scored); Telo (penalty scored); Gerson (penalty scored); Thelin (penalty scored); Luts (penalty missed)		(penalty scored) Johansson; (penalty scored) Fejzullahu; (penalty scored) Jawo; (penalty scored) Oyal; (penalty scored) Arvidsson

4 April 2013	Östers IF	2–1	IK Sirius	Växjö
17:30	Persson 16'; Söderberg 76'	Report	Björkebaum 79'	Stadium: Växjö Tipshall; Attendance: 1,267; Referee: Bojan Pandzić (Gothenburg)

=== Semi-finals ===
The semi-finals were played on 1 May 2013 and consisted of the four winners from the quarter-finals. The teams drawn first were the home teams. The draw for the semi-finals took place on 8 April 2013, with Örgryte IS from Superettan remaining as the lowest-ranked team.

1 May 2013	Djurgårdens IF	1–0	Örgryte IS	Stockholm
13:30	Johansson 59'	Report		Stadium: Stockholm Stadion; Attendance: 7,126; Referee: Martin Strömbergsson (Gävle)

1 May 2013	Östers IF	1–4	IFK Göteborg	Växjö
13:30	Robledo 50'	Report	Hysén 9', 52'; Moberg Karlsson 69', 81'	Stadium: Myresjöhus Arena; Attendance: 6,047; Referee: Michael Lerjéus (Skövde)

=== Final ===
The final was played on 26 May 2013 at Friends Arena, Solna. The home team was designated through a draw.

26 May 2013
17:00

Djurgårdens IF	1–1 (a.e.t.)	IFK Göteborg
Amartey 52'	Report	Hysén 6'
Penalties
Jawo (penalty missed); Johansson (penalty scored); Solignac (penalty missed); Nymann (penalty missed)	1–3	(penalty scored) Haglund; (penalty missed) Bjärsmyr; (penalty scored) Dyrestam; (penalty scored) Farnerud

Friends Arena, Solna
Attendance: 21,819
Referee: Stefan Johannesson (Täby)
