= 2013 Division 1 (Swedish football) =

Division 1
- Season: 2013
- Champions: IK Sirius (Norra); Husqvarna FF (Södra)
- Promoted: IK Sirius; Husqvarna FF
- Relegated: Sandvikens IF; Selånger FK; Eskilstuna City; Torslanda IK; IF Limhamn Bunkeflo; Karlstad BK
- Matches: 364
- Goals: 1,052 (2.89 per match)
- Top goalscorer: Stellan Carlsson; Moses Ogbu (18) (Norra); Allan Borgvardt (15) (Södra)
- Highest attendance: 4,000; IK Sirius 4–1 Nyköpings BIS (22 September 2013)

The 2013 Division 1, part of the 2013 Swedish football season, was the 8th season of Sweden's third-tier football league in its current format. The 2013 fixtures were released in December 2012. The season started on 14 April 2013 and ended on 27 October 2013.

== Teams ==
A total of 28 teams contested the league, divided into two division, Norra and Södra. 20 returning from the 2012 season, two relegated from Superettan and six promoted from Division 2. The champion of each division qualified directly for promotion to Superettan, the two runners-up had to play a play-off against the thirteenth and fourteenth team from Superettan to decide who would play in Superettan 2014. The bottom three teams in each division qualified directly for relegation to Division 2.

=== Stadia and locations ===
Location of the 2013 Division 1 teams. Division 1 Norra are red dots while Division 1 Södra are green dots.

==== Norra ====
Team	Location	Stadium	Stadium capacity^{1}
AFC United	Upplands Väsby	Vilundavallen	4,000
BK Forward	Örebro	Trängens IP	4,700
Dalkurd FF	Borlänge	Domnarvsvallen	6,500
Eskilstuna City	Eskilstuna	Tunavallen	7,800
IFK Luleå	Luleå	Skogsvallen	7,000
IK Frej	Täby	Vikingavallen	1,250
IK Sirius	Uppsala	Studenternas IP	7,600
Nyköpings BIS	Nyköping	Rosvalla IP	1,000
Sandvikens IF	Sandviken	Jernvallen	7,000
Selånger FK	Sundsvall	Norrporten Arena	7,700
Umeå FC	Umeå	T3 Arena	10,000
Valsta Syrianska IK	Märsta	Midgårdsvallen	2,400
Vasalunds IF	Solna	Skytteholms IP	3,000
Västerås SK	Västerås	Swedbank Park	7,000

==== Södra ====
Team	Location	Stadium	Stadium capacity^{1}
FC Trollhättan	Trollhättan	Edsborgs IP	5,100
Husqvarna FF	Huskvarna	Vapenvallen	4,000
IF Limhamn Bunkeflo	Malmö	Limhamns IP	2,800
IF Sylvia	Norrköping	Idrottsparken	17,200
IK Oddevold	Uddevalla	Rimnersvallen	10,600
IS Halmia	Halmstad	Örjans Vall	15,500
Karlstad BK	Karlstad	Tingvalla IP	10,000
Kristianstads FF	Kristianstad	Kristianstads IP	6,000
Lunds BK	Lund	Klostergårdens IP	8,560
Qviding FIF	Gothenburg	Valhalla IP	4,000
Skövde AIK	Skövde	Södermalms IP	4,646
Torslanda IK	Torslanda	Torslandavallen	1,500
Trelleborgs FF	Trelleborg	Vångavallen	10,000
Utsiktens BK	Gothenburg	Ruddalens IP	5,000

- ^{1} Correct as of end of 2012 season

== League tables ==
=== Norra ===
Pos	Team	Pld	W	D	L	GF	GA	GD	Pts	Qualification or relegation
1	IK Sirius (C, P)	26	21	5	0	79	16	+63	68	Promotion to Superettan
2	Dalkurd FF	26	15	5	6	48	25	+23	50	Qualification to Promotion playoffs
3	Nyköpings BIS	26	15	4	7	43	26	+17	49	
4	BK Forward	26	10	11	5	45	28	+17	41	
5	IFK Luleå	26	11	6	9	45	46	−1	39	
6	Umeå FC	26	11	4	11	42	37	+5	37	
7	Vasalunds IF	26	11	2	13	36	38	−2	35	
8	IK Frej	26	10	5	11	30	39	−9	35	
9	Valsta Syrianska IK	26	9	4	13	31	48	−17	31	
10	AFC United	26	8	6	12	32	40	−8	30	
11	Västerås SK	26	8	6	12	31	52	−21	30	
12	Sandvikens IF (R)	26	7	6	13	31	45	−14	27	Relegation to Division 2
13	Selånger FK (R)	26	5	5	16	25	46	−21	20	Relegation to Division 2
14	Eskilstuna City (R)	26	4	5	17	30	62	−32	17	Relegation to Division 2

Source: svenskfotboll.se (in Swedish)
Rules for classification: 1) points; 2) goal difference; 3) number of goals scored.
(C) Champions; (P) Promoted; (R) Relegated

=== Södra ===
Pos	Team	Pld	W	D	L	GF	GA	GD	Pts	Qualification or relegation
1	Husqvarna FF (C, P)	26	17	5	4	42	17	+25	56	Promotion to Superettan
2	IK Oddevold	26	14	7	5	49	29	+20	49	Qualification to Promotion playoffs
3	Trelleborgs FF	26	14	3	9	41	38	+3	45	
4	IS Halmia	26	12	7	7	40	30	+10	43	
5	Utsiktens BK	26	11	8	7	33	29	+4	41	
6	FC Trollhättan	26	12	5	9	39	36	+3	41	
7	IF Sylvia	26	10	8	8	44	41	+3	38	
8	Qviding FIF	26	9	7	10	34	36	−2	34	
9	Skövde AIK	26	9	6	11	34	36	−2	33	
10	Lunds BK	26	9	5	12	46	41	+5	32	
11	Kristianstads FF	26	9	4	13	38	43	−5	31	
12	Torslanda IK (R)	26	6	5	15	24	39	−15	23	Relegation to Division 2
13	IF Limhamn Bunkeflo (R)	26	6	5	15	30	56	−26	23	Relegation to Division 2
14	Karlstad BK (R)	26	4	5	17	25	48	−23	17	Relegation to Division 2

Source: svenskfotboll.se (in Swedish)
Rules for classification: 1) points; 2) goal difference; 3) number of goals scored.
(C) Champions; (P) Promoted; (R) Relegated

=== Positions by round ===
==== Norra ====
Team ╲ Round	1	2	3	4	5	6	7	8	9	10	11	12	13	14	15	16	17	18	19	20	21	22	23	24	25	26
IK Sirius	1	1	1	1	1	1	1	1	1	1	1	1	1	1	1	1	1	1	1	1	1	1	1	1	1	1
Dalkurd FF	6	3	4	2	2	2	2	2	2	2	2	2	2	2	2	2	2	2	3	3	2	2	2	2	2	2
Nyköpings BIS	8	4	2	3	4	5	6	7	7	3	3	3	3	3	3	3	3	3	2	2	3	3	3	3	3	3
BK Forward	3	6	5	5	3	4	4	3	3	5	5	5	5	5	5	5	5	5	4	6	6	6	5	5	4	4
IFK Luleå	7	11	11	8	8	7	5	4	5	4	4	4	4	4	4	4	4	4	5	4	4	4	4	4	5	5
Umeå FC	4	8	8	10	12	12	13	11	12	6	6	6	6	6	6	6	6	6	6	5	5	5	6	7	7	6
Vasalunds IF	13	9	7	7	6	3	3	5	6	9	9	9	9	9	9	9	9	9	9	9	10	10	9	9	8	7
IK Frej	12	14	14	14	14	14	14	14	14	8	8	8	8	8	8	8	8	8	7	8	8	7	7	6	6	8
Valsta Syrianska IK	5	2	6	6	7	8	9	10	11	7	7	7	7	7	7	7	7	7	8	7	7	8	8	8	9	9
AFC United	10	12	13	13	13	13	11	8	8	10	10	10	10	10	10	10	10	10	11	10	9	9	10	11	11	10
Västerås SK	9	5	3	4	5	6	7	6	4	11	11	11	11	11	11	11	11	11	10	11	11	11	11	10	10	11
Sandvikens IF	11	13	12	12	11	11	8	9	10	14	14	14	14	14	14	14	14	14	14	14	14	13	12	12	12	12
Selånger FK	2	7	9	11	10	10	12	13	9	13	13	13	13	13	13	13	13	13	12	12	12	12	13	13	13	13
Eskilstuna City	14	10	10	9	9	9	10	12	13	12	12	12	12	12	12	12	12	12	13	13	13	14	14	14	14	14

Source: everysport.com (in Swedish)

==== Södra ====
Team ╲ Round	1	2	3	4	5	6	7	8	9	10	11	12	13	14	15	16	17	18	19	20	21	22	23	24	25	26
Husqvarna FF	3	1	2	1	1	1	1	1	1	1	1	1	1	1	1	1	1	1	1	1	1	1	1	1	1	1
IK Oddevold	8	8	6	6	3	3	7	5	4	4	6	5	3	4	2	2	2	2	2	2	2	2	2	2	2	2
Trelleborgs FF	4	6	10	11	8	2	2	4	5	7	5	4	5	5	4	3	4	4	3	4	3	3	3	3	4	3
IS Halmia	13	11	7	10	9	4	3	2	2	2	2	2	2	2	3	5	5	5	5	5	5	5	5	4	3	4
Utsiktens BK	5	5	1	4	2	5	4	6	6	5	4	6	6	6	7	7	7	7	6	6	6	6	6	7	6	5
FC Trollhättan	12	10	12	7	6	6	8	10	7	9	11	8	8	7	6	6	6	6	7	7	7	7	7	6	5	6
IF Sylvia	6	3	4	2	4	7	5	3	3	3	3	3	4	3	5	4	3	3	4	3	4	4	4	5	7	7
Qviding FIF	10	13	14	14	14	14	14	14	14	14	14	14	14	14	13	13	13	13	13	11	10	8	10	9	8	8
Skövde AIK	14	12	9	9	7	10	10	8	9	6	7	7	7	8	8	8	8	8	11	12	11	9	8	8	9	9
Lunds BK	7	7	13	12	12	12	12	12	11	8	9	11	11	11	10	12	9	9	8	9	8	10	11	10	10	10
Kristianstads FF	2	4	8	8	11	9	9	11	12	12	10	12	12	12	12	11	11	11	9	8	9	11	9	11	11	11
Torslanda IK	9	9	5	3	5	8	6	7	8	10	8	10	9	9	9	9	10	10	12	13	13	13	13	12	12	12
IF Limhamn Bunkeflo	1	2	3	5	10	11	11	9	10	11	12	9	10	10	11	10	12	12	10	10	12	12	12	13	13	13
Karlstad BK	11	14	11	13	13	13	13	13	13	13	13	13	13	13	14	14	14	14	14	14	14	14	14	14	14	14

Promotion to Superettan
Promotion play-offs
Relegation to Division 2

Source: everysport.com (in Swedish)

== Results ==
=== Norra ===
Home \ Away	AFC	BKF	DFF	ECFK	IFKL	IKF	IKS	NBIS	SIF	SFK	UFC	VS	VIF	VSK
AFC United		1–1	0–0	1–0	1–1	1–0	2–2	0–3	1–1	2–0	2–3	1–0	1–3	5–1
BK Forward	4–0		0–0	6–1	2–3	2–2	0–0	3–1	3–1	3–0	3–0	2–0	3–1	0–0
Dalkurd FF	2–1	1–2		2–1	1–1	0–1	1–1	1–2	2–4	1–0	2–0	2–1	1–1	5–0
Eskilstuna City	2–3	2–1	0–2		2–2	2–0	2–4	2–1	1–1	1–3	1–1	1–2	2–1	1–3
IFK Luleå	1–0	1–0	2–5	3–1		2–1	0–3	0–1	2–2	1–0	0–4	3–2	3–1	4–2
IK Frej	2–2	2–2	1–0	2–1	0–1		0–3	1–3	1–0	2–1	0–2	5–1	1–2	0–0
IK Sirius	1–0	3–1	4–1	7–0	2–0	5–0		4–1	5–0	3–1	0–0	5–1	2–1	7–3
Nyköpings BIS	6–0	3–0	0–2	1–1	1–0	0–1	1–1		3–2	0–0	2–0	2–1	0–1	1–1
Sandvikens IF	0–3	1–1	0–1	3–0	2–2	0–1	0–3	0–1		0–0	3–1	2–3	2–1	2–0
Selånger FK	2–1	4–5	0–4	2–2	1–5	1–3	0–3	0–1	0–1		4–1	0–0	1–4	0–0
Umeå FC	2–1	0–0	0–3	5–1	3–2	4–0	0–1	2–3	4–1	1–0		0–2	0–1	4–0
Valsta Syrianska IK	1–0	0–0	1–4	2–1	2–1	1–1	0–2	1–4	4–2	1–0	1–1		4–3	0–2
Vasalunds IF	2–1	0–0	2–3	2–1	3–1	2–3	0–2	1–0	0–1	0–3	2–1	2–0		0–1
Västerås SK	0–2	1–1	0–2	2–1	4–4	1–0	1–6	1–2	2–0	1–2	2–3	2–0	1–0	

Source: svenskfotboll.se (in Swedish)
Legend: Blue = home team win; Yellow = draw; Red = away team win.

=== Södra ===
Home \ Away	FCT	HFF	LB07	IFS	IKO	ISH	KBK	KFF	LBK	QFIF	SAIK	TIK	TFF	UBK
FC Trollhättan		1–3	0–2	1–1	2–2	3–3	2–0	3–1	2–0	2–0	1–3	1–0	0–1	0–2
Husqvarna FF	1–0		3–0	1–1	3–1	1–0	4–0	1–0	0–2	1–0	2–0	3–1	0–0	1–0
IF Limhamn Bunkeflo	3–2	1–3		1–2	1–5	0–0	0–4	1–3	1–3	2–3	3–0	0–3	1–1	0–0
IF Sylvia	0–0	1–1	4–0		2–3	0–1	2–1	2–1	2–2	0–3	3–1	3–1	3–1	4–3
IK Oddevold	2–3	1–0	2–0	2–1		2–0	0–0	3–1	1–1	1–1	3–0	1–1	0–1	3–2
IS Halmia	2–1	0–2	1–2	4–1	2–1		3–0	3–0	2–1	1–1	1–1	4–1	0–2	2–0
Karlstad BK	0–2	0–2	3–1	2–0	2–3	0–1		2–4	3–0	1–3	0–0	0–3	1–2	1–2
Kristianstads FF	2–3	2–2	0–0	3–1	0–0	2–4	4–0		1–0	0–1	2–0	0–0	3–2	2–3
Lunds BK	0–0	1–2	6–2	5–2	2–2	1–2	3–2	0–2		2–2	2–3	4–1	0–1	0–1
Qviding FIF	1–3	1–1	1–4	0–3	1–2	1–1	1–1	3–1	4–3		1–0	3–0	3–1	0–0
Skövde AIK	1–2	0–2	3–1	0–0	0–3	3–2	0–0	5–1	0–1	1–0		2–1	5–0	0–0
Torslanda IK	1–2	0–1	1–0	1–1	0–2	0–0	3–0	1–2	0–2	1–0	1–3		1–2	1–0
Trelleborgs FF	5–0	2–1	0–1	2–4	0–3	4–1	2–1	2–1	0–3	3–0	2–2	3–1		2–1
Utsiktens BK	0–3	2–1	3–3	1–1	3–1	0–0	1–1	1–0	3–2	1–0	2–1	0–0	2–0	

Source: svenskfotboll.se (in Swedish)
Legend: Blue = home team win; Yellow = draw; Red = away team win.

== Season statistics ==
=== Norra top scorers ===
Rank	Player	Club	Goals
1	(Sweden) Stellan Carlsson	BK Forward	18
1	(Nigeria) Moses Ogbu	IK Sirius	18
3	(Sweden) Simon Mårtensson	Umeå FC	16
4	(Sweden) Daniel Ahonen	IFK Luleå	15
4	(Sweden) Dago Funes	Nyköpings BIS	15
6	(Sweden) Jesper Carlsson	AFC United	11
6	(Sweden) Christer Gustafsson	IK Sirius	11
6	(Nigeria) Chidi Dauda Omeje	Dalkurd FF	11
9	(Sweden) Daniel Andersson	Selånger FK	10
10	(Sweden) Ferid Ali	Vasalunds IF	8

=== Södra top scorers ===
Rank	Player	Club	Goals
1	(Denmark) Allan Borgvardt	IF Sylvia	15
2	(Sweden) Alexander Jeremejeff	Qviding FIF	14
3	(Sweden) Calle Genberg	IS Halmia	13
4	(Sweden) Ronny Sabo	IS Halmia	12
5	(Sweden) Sebastian Ohlsson	Skövde AIK	11
5	(Sweden) Josef Daoud	FC Trollhättan	11
7	(Sweden) Jesper Westermark	IK Oddevold	10
7	(Sweden) Michell Haidari	Husqvarna FF	10
7	(Sweden) Johan Patriksson	IK Oddevold	10
7	(Sweden) Dardan Mustafa	Lunds BK	10
7	(Sweden) Linus Olsson	Trelleborgs FF	10

== See also ==
- 2013 Allsvenskan
- 2013 Superettan
- 2012–13 Svenska Cupen
- 2013 Svenska Supercupen
