= 2014 Division 1 (Swedish football) =

Division 1
- Season: 2014
- Champions: AFC United (Norra); Utsiktens BK (Södra)
- Promoted: AFC United; Utsiktens BK; IK Frej
- Relegated: IF Sylvia; Valsta Syrianska IK; Skellefteå FF; FC Trollhättan; Skövde AIK; IFK Uddevalla
- Top goalscorer: Salif Camara Jönsson (27 goals, Södra); Sencer Soguk (16 goals, Norra)
- Highest attendance: 5,969; Örgryte IS 4–0 FC Trollhättan (22 September 2014)

The 2014 Division 1, part of the 2014 Swedish football season, was the 9th season of Sweden's third-tier football league in its current format. The 2014 fixtures were released in December 2013. The season started on 20 April 2014 and concluded on 2 November 2014.

== Teams ==
A total of 28 teams contested the league, divided into two divisions, Norra and Södra. 20 returning from the 2012 season, two relegated from Superettan and six promoted from Division 2. The champion of each division qualified directly for promotion to Superettan, the two runners-up had to play a play-off against the thirteenth and fourteenth team from Superettan to decide who would play in Superettan 2015. The bottom three teams in each division qualified directly for relegation to Division 2. Due to four promoted teams from Division 2 being geographically located in Division 1 Södra, IF Sylvia were relocated from Division 1 Södra to Division 1 Norra.

=== Stadia and locations ===
Location of the 2014 Division 1 teams. Division 1 Norra are red dots while Division 1 Södra are green dots.

==== Norra ====
Team	Location	Stadium	Stadium capacity^{1}
AFC United	Stockholm	Skytteholms IP	5,000
BK Forward	Örebro	Trängens IP	4,700
Dalkurd FF	Borlänge	Domnarvsvallen	6,500
Huddinge IF	Huddinge	Källbrinks IP	N/A
IF Sylvia	Norrköping	Idrottsparken	17,200
IFK Luleå	Luleå	Skogsvallen	7,000
IK Brage	Borlänge	Domnarvsvallen	6,500
IK Frej	Täby	Vikingavallen	1,250
Nyköpings BIS	Nyköping	Rosvalla IP	1,000
Skellefteå FF	Skellefteå	Norrvalla IP	N/A
Umeå FC	Umeå	T3 Arena	10,000
Valsta Syrianska IK	Märsta	Midgårdsvallen	2,400
Vasalunds IF	Stockholm	Skytteholms IP	5,000
Västerås SK	Västerås	Swedbank Park	7,000

==== Södra ====
Team	Location	Stadium	Stadium capacity^{1}
FC Trollhättan	Trollhättan	Edsborgs IP	5,100
IFK Uddevalla	Uddevalla	Kamratgården	1,500
IK Oddevold	Uddevalla	Rimnersvallen	10,600
IS Halmia	Halmstad	Örjans Vall	15,500
Kristianstads FF	Kristianstad	Kristianstads IP	6,000
Lunds BK	Lund	Klostergårdens IP	8,560
Motala AIF	Motala	Motala Idrottspark	8,500
Norrby IF	Borås	Borås Arena	16,899
Oskarshamns AIK	Oskarshamn	Arena Oskarshamn	2,000
Qviding FIF	Gothenburg	Valhalla IP	4,000
Skövde AIK	Skövde	Södermalms IP	4,646
Trelleborgs FF	Trelleborg	Vångavallen	10,000
Utsiktens BK	Gothenburg	Ruddalens IP	5,000
Örgryte IS	Gothenburg	Valhalla IP	4,000

- ^{1} Correct as of end of 2013 season

== League tables ==
=== Norra ===
Pos	Team	Pld	W	D	L	GF	GA	GD	Pts	Qualification or relegation
1	AFC United (C, P)	26	19	1	6	52	22	+30	58	Promotion to Superettan
2	IK Frej (O, P)	26	16	7	3	44	21	+23	55	Qualification to Promotion playoffs
3	Dalkurd FF	26	16	6	4	44	20	+24	54	
4	IK Brage	26	15	6	5	40	25	+15	51	
5	Vasalunds IF	26	12	3	11	37	43	−6	39	
6	BK Forward	26	11	4	11	43	40	+3	37	
7	Nyköpings BIS	26	11	2	13	38	33	+5	35	
8	Huddinge IF	26	10	4	12	32	34	−2	34	
9	Umeå FC	26	9	6	11	38	35	+3	33	
10	IFK Luleå	26	7	10	9	39	40	−1	31	
11	Västerås SK	26	7	3	16	38	52	−14	24	
12	IF Sylvia (R)	26	6	5	15	36	53	−17	23	Relegation to Division 2
13	Valsta Syrianska IK (R)	26	6	4	16	40	59	−19	22	Relegation to Division 2
14	Skellefteå FF (R)	26	6	1	19	28	72	−44	19	Relegation to Division 2

Source: svenskfotboll.se (in Swedish)
Rules for classification: 1) points; 2) goal difference; 3) number of goals scored.
(C) Champions; (O) Play-off winners; (P) Promoted; (R) Relegated

=== Södra ===
Pos	Team	Pld	W	D	L	GF	GA	GD	Pts	Qualification or relegation
1	Utsiktens BK (C, P)	26	17	4	5	47	26	+21	55	Promotion to Superettan
2	Örgryte IS	26	14	6	6	45	33	+12	48	Qualification to Promotion playoffs
3	Lunds BK	26	13	5	8	66	45	+21	44	
4	Motala AIF	26	13	5	8	53	37	+16	44	
5	IK Oddevold	26	12	5	9	43	44	−1	41	
6	Norrby IF	26	10	6	10	51	45	+6	36	
7	IS Halmia	26	10	6	10	39	37	+2	36	
8	Qviding FIF	26	10	5	11	35	38	−3	35	
9	Oskarshamns AIK	26	9	7	10	39	45	−6	34	
10	Kristianstads FF	26	9	7	10	33	44	−11	34	
11	Trelleborgs FF	26	8	8	10	36	34	+2	32	
12	FC Trollhättan (R)	26	9	5	12	42	44	−2	32	Relegation to Division 2
13	Skövde AIK (R)	26	4	7	15	29	50	−21	19	Relegation to Division 2
14	IFK Uddevalla (R)	26	3	6	17	23	59	−36	15	Relegation to Division 2

Source: svenskfotboll.se (in Swedish)
Rules for classification: 1) points; 2) goal difference; 3) number of goals scored.
(C) Champions; (P) Promoted; (R) Relegated

== Positions by round ==
=== Norra ===
Team ╲ Round	1	2	3	4	5	6	7	8	9	10	11	12	13	14	15	16	17	18	19	20	21	22	23	24	25	26
AFC United	9	5	5	2	2	2	2	2	2	2	2	2	2	2	1	1	1	1	1	1	1	1	2	2	1	1
IK Frej	4	2	1	1	1	1	1	1	1	1	1	1	1	1	2	2	2	2	2	2	2	2	1	1	2	2
Dalkurd FF	7	4	2	3	3	3	5	3	4	3	4	4	4	4	4	4	4	4	4	4	4	4	4	3	3	3
IK Brage	5	7	7	5	4	4	3	4	3	4	3	3	3	3	3	3	3	3	3	3	3	3	3	4	4	4
Vasalunds IF	12	9	11	11	10	7	9	10	8	6	5	5	5	5	5	5	5	5	5	5	5	5	5	5	5	5
BK Forward	11	14	8	10	11	12	12	11	11	9	7	7	7	8	8	9	9	9	9	9	10	8	7	8	7	6
Nyköpings BIS	3	6	3	7	8	11	8	9	10	13	12	9	11	12	13	10	7	7	7	7	6	6	8	6	6	7
Huddinge IF	6	8	10	9	5	5	4	5	6	7	8	8	10	11	10	8	10	10	10	10	9	7	6	7	9	8
Umeå FC	8	11	13	13	14	14	14	14	14	12	11	12	8	7	7	6	8	8	8	8	8	10	10	9	10	9
IFK Luleå	1	3	6	6	7	10	7	6	5	5	6	6	6	6	6	7	6	6	6	6	7	9	9	10	8	10
Västerås SK	13	12	14	14	12	9	11	8	9	10	13	13	14	13	12	13	11	11	11	11	11	11	13	13	11	11
IF Sylvia	14	10	12	12	13	13	13	13	13	11	9	10	9	10	11	12	12	12	12	12	12	12	11	12	12	12
Valsta Syrianska IK	2	1	4	4	6	8	10	12	12	14	14	14	13	14	14	14	14	14	14	14	14	14	12	11	13	13
Skellefteå FF	10	13	9	8	9	7	6	7	7	8	10	11	12	9	9	11	13	13	13	13	13	13	14	14	14	14

Source: everysport.com

=== Södra ===
Team ╲ Round	1	2	3	4	5	6	7	8	9	10	11	12	13	14	15	16	17	18	19	20	21	22	23	24	25	26
Utsiktens BK	4	2	2	3	5	4	5	3	3	3	3	4	3	3	2	2	2	2	2	2	2	1	1	1	1	1
Örgryte IS	5	1	1	1	4	2	1	1	1	1	1	1	1	1	1	1	1	1	1	1	1	2	2	2	2	2
Lunds BK	13	5	9	7	7	7	3	5	5	4	4	3	2	2	3	3	3	3	3	3	3	3	3	3	3	3
Motala AIF	3	7	4	4	3	1	4	6	7	5	6	6	7	5	7	6	5	5	5	5	4	4	4	4	4	4
IK Oddevold	8	4	3	2	1	3	2	2	2	2	2	2	4	4	4	4	4	4	4	4	5	5	5	5	5	5
Norrby IF	2	3	6	5	2	7	6	8	9	9	9	9	8	6	5	7	7	7	7	7	7	6	6	8	9	6
IS Halmia	6	12	13	14	12	11	11	10	10	10	11	10	10	11	10	10	10	10	10	10	11	11	9	7	6	7
Qviding FIF	14	13	8	9	6	5	7	4	4	6	8	7	5	7	9	9	8	8	8	8	8	8	7	6	7	8
Oskarshamns AIK	7	8	11	11	13	13	12	12	11	11	10	11	11	10	12	12	12	12	12	12	10	9	8	9	8	9
Kristianstads FF	9	14	7	8	10	10	8	6	8	7	5	5	6	8	6	5	6	6	6	6	6	7	10	10	10	10
Trelleborgs FF	10	9	5	6	8	9	9	11	12	12	12	12	12	12	11	11	9	9	9	9	9	10	11	12	11	11
FC Trollhättan	1	6	10	10	11	8	10	9	6	8	7	8	9	9	8	8	11	11	11	11	12	12	12	11	12	12
Skövde AIK	12	11	14	12	9	12	13	13	14	14	14	14	14	14	14	14	13	13	13	13	13	13	13	13	13	13
IFK Uddevalla	11	10	12	13	14	14	14	14	13	13	13	13	13	13	13	13	14	14	14	14	14	14	14	14	14	14

Promotion to Superettan
Promotion play-offs
Relegation to Division 2

Source: everysport.com

== Results ==
=== Norra ===
Home \ Away	AFC	BKF	DFF	HIF	IFS	IFKL	IKB	IKF	NBIS	SFF	UFC	VS	VIF	VSK
AFC United		2–0	2–1	1–3	2–0	3–1	1–0	0–2	3–0	8–0	2–0	3–1	3–2	3–2
BK Forward	0–3		0–1	2–2	5–1	1–0	0–1	2–4	2–1	4–0	1–0	2–1	2–1	1–2
Dalkurd FF	0–1	1–0		2–0	5–2	2–2	0–0	2–1	2–0	3–1	1–3	0–0	1–2	5–0
Huddinge IF	0–1	2–0	0–1		3–0	2–1	0–4	1–1	1–2	1–0	0–1	2–1	2–1	2–3
IF Sylvia	1–1	2–2	0–2	1–2		1–2	2–1	1–2	0–1	3–0	2–2	1–2	1–1	2–2
IFK Luleå	0–4	1–1	0–2	0–0	4–0		0–1	0–0	3–0	5–0	0–0	4–1	1–2	2–2
IK Brage	2–1	4–3	2–4	1–1	4–2	1–1		1–1	1–0	2–0	1–1	1–1	1–2	2–0
IK Frej	1–0	5–1	0–0	2–0	1–0	2–2	0–1		1–1	3–2	3–1	0–0	0–1	3–2
Nyköpings BIS	1–0	2–4	1–2	3–2	4–2	4–1	0–1	0–1		4–0	0–0	2–0	2–0	3–0
Skellefteå FF	0–3	0–4	0–2	1–0	2–3	2–2	1–2	0–2	1–0		3–4	4–3	2–3	0–4
Umeå FC	0–1	2–0	1–1	0–2	0–4	2–3	0–1	1–3	1–0	0–2		3–1	0–0	4–0
Valsta Syrianska IK	0–1	2–5	2–2	2–1	1–3	4–0	1–3	1–3	1–7	2–3	3–2		2–3	4–2
Vasalunds IF	0–1	0–0	0–1	3–2	2–1	1–2	0–1	1–2	2–0	3–1	0–7	1–4		2–1
Västerås SK	2–4	0–1	0–1	0–1	0–1	2–2	3–1	0–1	2–0	2–3	3–0	1–0	3–4	

Source: svenskfotboll.se (in Swedish)
Legend: Blue = home team win; Yellow = draw; Red = away team win.

=== Södra ===
Home \ Away	FCT	IFKU	IKO	ISH	KFF	LBK	MAIF	NIF	OAIK	QFIF	SAIK	TFF	UBK	ÖIS
FC Trollhättan		1–0	1–1	0–2	4–1	3–3	1–2	0–1	3–0	4–0	1–1	0–2	0–2	1–2
IFK Uddevalla	0–5		1–2	0–2	2–3	1–0	3–1	0–0	1–1	0–5	1–2	1–1	1–2	1–1
IK Oddevold	3–2	2–0		3–2	0–1	4–3	2–1	1–3	2–3	1–2	2–1	2–1	1–0	3–3
IS Halmia	2–0	0–2	2–1		1–1	0–1	2–1	2–3	5–1	1–0	4–2	0–0	0–5	0–3
Kristianstads FF	0–1	3–1	1–1	0–1		0–2	1–2	1–5	3–2	2–1	4–1	2–2	2–2	0–0
Lunds BK	3–1	4–2	5–1	2–0	6–1		3–3	4–4	4–2	3–4	6–0	2–1	1–2	4–2
Motala AIF	4–1	4–0	3–0	2–1	0–1	3–0		2–1	2–0	2–2	1–1	3–2	1–2	3–0
Norrby IF	2–4	7–1	2–3	1–1	0–1	3–1	2–4		2–3	1–1	3–2	2–1	4–1	1–2
Oskarshamns AIK	2–2	2–0	0–1	2–2	5–2	2–2	2–2	1–0		1–0	3–0	1–0	0–0	4–1
Qviding FIF	0–1	3–2	3–2	2–1	0–1	0–4	2–3	1–2	1–1		1–0	1–0	0–2	1–1
Skövde AIK	3–4	2–2	1–3	1–1	1–1	1–2	0–0	0–0	3–0	1–3		3–2	2–3	0–1
Trelleborgs FF	1–1	1–1	2–1	2–2	2–0	0–0	3–1	2–2	2–1	1–0	0–1		0–3	1–2
Utsiktens BK	3–1	3–0	1–1	0–4	1–0	2–0	3–2	3–0	2–0	0–0	1–0	0–3		3–1
Örgryte IS	4–0	2–0	0–0	2–1	1–1	3–1	2–1	3–0	3–0	1–2	1–0	2–4	2–1	

Source: svenskfotboll.se (in Swedish)
Legend: Blue = home team win; Yellow = draw; Red = away team win.

== Season statistics ==
=== Norra top scorers ===
Rank	Player	Club	Goals
1	(Sweden) Sencer Soguk	Valsta Syrianska IK	16
2	(Sweden) Erido Poli	Huddinge IF	14
2	(Sweden) Thomas Eriksson	IFK Luleå	14
4	(Denmark) Allan Borgvardt	IF Sylvia	13
4	(Sweden) Linus Lamu	BK Forward	13
6	(Sweden) Danny Persson	Umeå FC	12
6	(Liberia) Sam Johnson	IK Frej	12
8	(Nigeria) Chidi Dauda Omeje	Dalkurd FF	11
8	(Sweden) Ferid Ali	Vasalunds IF	11
8	(Italy) Luca Gerbino Polo	AFC United	11

=== Södra top scorers ===
Rank	Player	Club	Goals
1	(Sweden) Salif Camara Jönsson	Lunds BK	27
2	(Sweden) Ibrahim Alushaj	Motala AIF	22
3	(Sweden) Luka Mijaljević	Utsiktens BK	20
3	(Sweden) Richard Yarsuvat	Norrby IF	20
5	(Sweden) Victor Mollapolci	FC Trollhättan	12
6	(Sweden) Admir Osmancevic	Lunds BK	11
6	(Sweden) Edin Hamidovic	Skövde AIK	11
6	(Sweden) Jesper Westermark	IK Oddevold	11
6	(Sweden) Josef Daoud	FC Trollhättan	11
10	(Sweden) Alexander Nilsson	Trelleborgs FF	10
10	(Sweden) Christopher Christensson	Oskarshamns AIK	10
10	(Sweden) David Bennhage	FC Trollhättan	10

== See also ==
- 2014 Allsvenskan
- 2014 Superettan
- 2013–14 Svenska Cupen
