= Linus =

Linus, a male given name, is the Latin form of the Greek name Linos. It is a common given name in Sweden. The origin of the name is unknown although the name appears in antiquity both as a musician who taught Apollo and as a son of Apollo who died in infancy from ancient Greece.

== People ==
- Pope Linus (died c. 80), second Bishop of Rome and Pope of the Catholic Church
- Linus Alperud (born 2005), Swedish footballer
- Linus Arnesson (born 1994), Swedish ice hockey player
- Linus Bylund (born 1978), Swedish politician
- Linus B. Comins (1817–1892), American politician
- Linus Diaz (born 1933), Sri Lankan long-distance runner
- Linus Eklöf (born 1989), Swedish motorcycle speedway rider
- Linus Eklöw (born 1979), better known by the stage name Style of Eye, Swedish DJ, producer, and songwriter
- Linus Fernström (born 1987), Swedish hockey player
- Linus Forslund (born 1988), Swedish bandy player
- Lonny Frey (1910–2009), American baseball player
- Linus Fröberg (born 1993), Swedish hockey player
- Linus Gerdemann (born 1982), German professional road bicycle racer
- Linus Görg (born 1994), German politician
- Linus Hallenius (born 1989), Swedish footballer
- Linus Hultström (born 1992), Swedish hockey player
- Linus Klasen (born 1986), Swedish hockey player
- Linus Lundqvist (born 1999), Swedish race car driver
- Linus Malmborg (born 1988), Swedish footballer
- Linus Malmqvist (born 1981), Swedish footballer
- J. Linus McAtee (1897–1963), American Hall of Fame jockey
- Linus Omark (born 1987), Swedish hockey player
- Linus Pauling (1901–1994), American chemist, winner of two Nobel Prizes (chemistry and peace)
- Linus Persson (ice hockey) (born 1985), Swedish ice hockey right winger
- Linus Persson (handballer) (born 1993), Swedish handball player
- Linus Pettersson (born 1987), Swedish bandy player
- Linus Roache (born 1964), English actor
- Linus Rönnberg (born 2003), Finnish footballer
- Linus Rönnqvist (born 1988), Swedish bandy player
- Linus Sandgren (born 1972), Swedish cinematographer
- Linus Sebastian (born 1986), Canadian YouTuber, creator and host of Linus Tech Tips and founder of Linus Media Group
- Linus Sköld (born 1983), Swedish politician
- Linus Sundström (born 1990), Swedish speedway rider
- Linus Svenning (born 1990), Swedish singer-songwriter
- Linus Thörnblad (born 1985), Swedish high jumper
- Linus Tornblad (born 1993), Swedish footballer
- Linus Torvalds (born 1969), Finnish-born American programmer, creator of the Linux kernel
- Linus Udofia (born 1993), Nigerian-born English boxer
- Linus Ullmark (born 1993), Swedish hockey player
- Linus Videll (born 1985), Swedish hockey player
- Linus Wahlgren (born 1976), Swedish actor
- Linus Wahlqvist (born 1996), Swedish footballer
- Linus Weissbach (born 1998), Swedish hockey player
- Linus Werneman (born 1992), Swedish hockey player
- Linus Yale Jr. (1821–1868), American mechanical engineer, son of Yale, Sr.
- Linus Yale Sr. (1797–1858), American inventor and manufacturer of locks

== Fictional and mythological characters ==
- Linus (mythology)
- Linus Caldwell, in the 2001 film Ocean's Eleven, played by Matt Damon
- Linus Larrabee, in Sabrina (1954 film) and Sabrina (1995 film)
- Linus Rawlings, in the film How the West Was Won, played by James Stewart
- Linus Spacehead, a playable character in the Quattro Adventure and Linus Spacehead's Cosmic Crusade video games
- Linus, a recurring character in Star Trek: Discovery
- The title character of Linus the Lionhearted, an American animated TV show
- Linus van Pelt, Charlie Brown’s security blanket toting best friend (and Lucy’s younger brother), from Charles M. Schulz’s iconic Peanuts comic strip.
- Linus Weems, in the young adult novel The Bunker Diary

== See also ==
- Pseudo-Linus, 4th century Christian writer
- Linious "Mac" McGee (1897–1988), American aviation pioneer and airline founder
