= Björn Andersson (footballer, born 1982) =

Swedish footballer

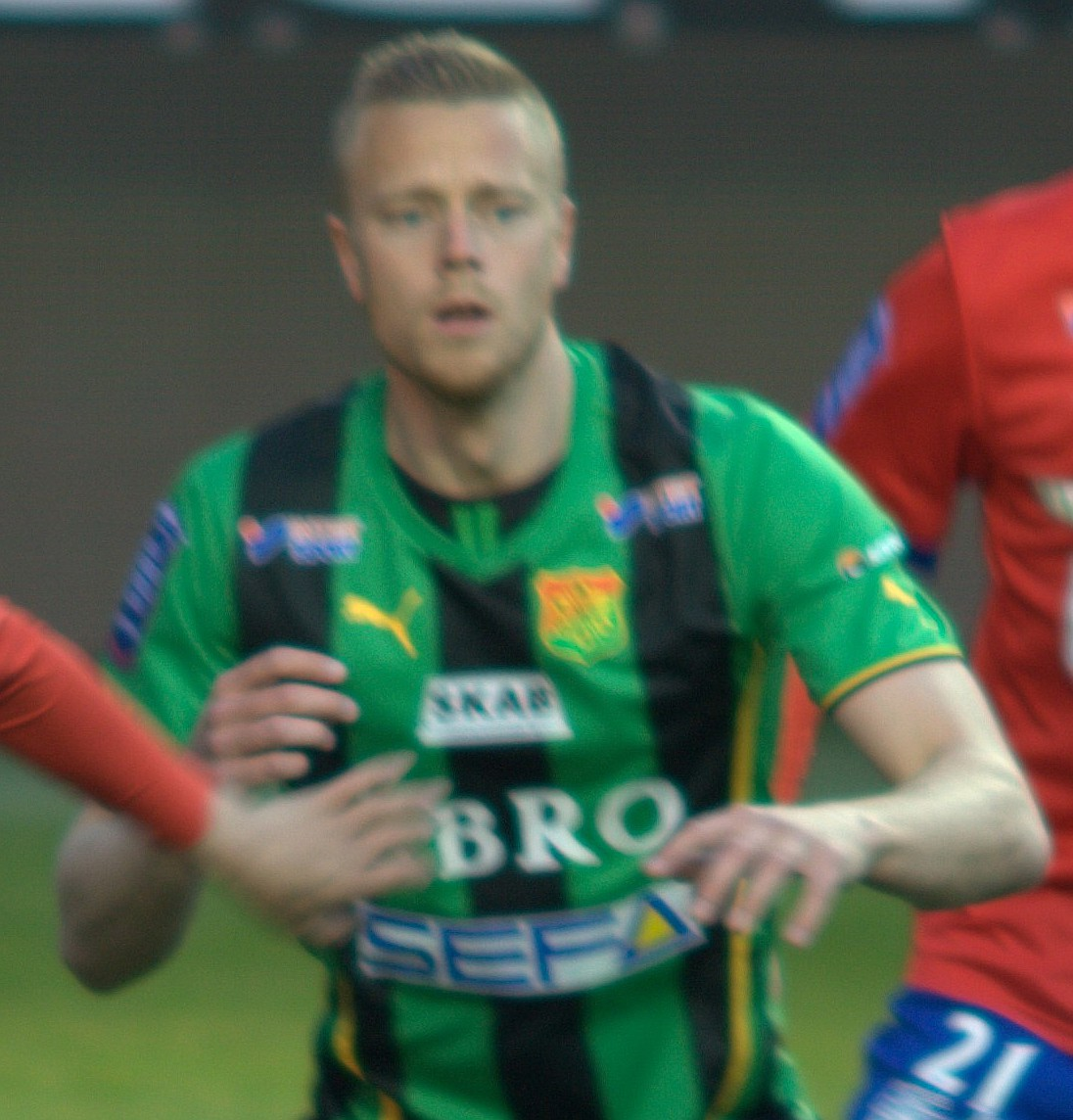

Personal information
- Full name: Björn Andersson
- Date of birth: 13 February 1982 (age 44)
- Place of birth: Fåglum, Sweden
- Height: 1.91 m (6 ft 3 in)
- Position: Defender

Youth career
- Fåglums IF

Senior career*
| Years | Team | Apps | (Gls) |
| –2002 | Trollhättans FK | | |
| 2002–2005 | FC Trollhättan | | |
| 2006–2007 | Qviding FIF | 42 | (6) |
| 2008–2010 | GAIS | 58 | (8) |
| 2011–2012 | Viking FK | 30 | (2) |
| 2013–2016 | GAIS | 82 | (6) |
- * Club domestic league appearances and goals

Björn Andersson (born 13 February 1982) is a Swedish footballer who last played for GAIS as a defender.

Andersson was born in Fåglum and started playing for lower league club Fåglums IF in the outskirts of Gothenburg. After leaving his childhood club he moved to third tier side Trollhättans FK which later turned into FC Trollhättan. He had played as a central defender up until that point but in 2004 the new manager Jonas Olsson decided to turn him into a forward. After doing well in that role he moved up one division and joined Superettan club Qviding FIF in 2006. There he returned to his previous role as central defender halfway through the first season.

In 2008 Andersson reached the highest level of Swedish football as he signed a three-year deal with Allsvenskan club GAIS. During his first year he was switched back and forth between playing as defender and forward. However, with the arrival of new manager Alexander Axén the following year Andersson only saw little playing time. The 2010 season turned out to be his strongest at GAIS as he became a permanent starter in central defence. After his contract was finished he had a two-year stint in Norway with Viking FK but in 2013 he returned to GAIS who had been relegated to second tier Superettan during his absence.
