= 2012–13 Svenska Cupen qualifying rounds =

The 2012–13 Svenska Cupen was the 57th season of Svenska Cupen and the first season since 2000–01 to be held according to the fall-spring season format. The season also reintroduced a group stage, the first since 1995–96.

A total of 96 clubs entered the competition. The first round commenced on 3 June 2012 and the final was contested on 26 May 2013 at Friends Arena in Solna. Helsingborgs IF were the defending champions, having beaten Kalmar FF 3–1 in last season's final.

IFK Göteborg won their sixth Svenska Cupen title on 26 May 2013 after defeating Djurgårdens IF 3–1 on penalties after the match had finished 1–1 after extra time.

The only one of the Swedish District Football Associations that had a qualifying round was Dalarnas FF, the other ones decided their teams in other ways. The first round commenced on 3 March 2012 and the final was contested on 22 May 2012.

== Dalarnas FF qualification ==
3 March 2012 Quarter-finals	Kvarnsvedens IK	7–1	Ulfshyttans IF	Borlänge
13:00	Fyhr 22', 66'; Johansson 31'; Stenberg 56', 73' (pen.), 89'; Hindrikes 83'	Report	Folmerz 42'	Stadium: Ljungbergsplanen; Attendance: 53; Referee: Henrik Matsson (Mora)

14 March 2012 Quarter-finals	Avesta AIK	0–6	Dalkurd FF	Avesta
19:00		Report	Serhanoglu 9'; Kizil 53'; Nouri 64'; Madi 76'; Sürek 82'; Ahmed 88'	Stadium: Avestavallen; Attendance: 120; Referee: Glenn Nyberg (Borlänge)

23 March 2012 Quarter-finals	Nyhammars IF	3–0	Långshyttans AIK	Hedemora
19:00	F. Andersson 23'; Friberg 28'; Hellsten 52'	Report		Stadium: Vasaliden Arena; Attendance: 30; Referee: Almir Alisić (Borlänge)

27 March 2012 Quarter-finals	Falu FK	4–1	Säters IF	Falun
19:00	Layouni 19', 69'; Mårtensson Millard 44'; Kayal 88'	Report	Andersson 90'	Stadium: Kopparvallen; Attendance: 85; Referee: Patrik Larsson (Borlänge)

3 April 2012 Semi-finals	Dalkurd FF	5–2	Kvarnvedens IK	Borlänge
18:00	Omeje 2'; Sürek 11'; Mambo Mumba 25'; Omoh 40', 66'	Report	Fyhr 9', 83'	Stadium: Domnarvsvallen; Attendance: 64; Referee: Henrik Matsson (Mora)

25 April 2012 Semi-finals	Nyhammars IF	0–6	Falu FK	Nyhammar
19:00		Report	Bolin 8', 78'; Abić 32'; Meftah 38', 79'; B. Jagne 69'	Stadium: Åvallen; Attendance: 55; Referee: Robert Nyberg (Borlänge)

22 May 2012 Final	Falu FK	3–2	Dalkurd FF	Falun
19:00	Layouni 18', 42'; O. Jagne 28'	Report	Halit 8'; Omoh 83'	Stadium: Kopparvallen; Attendance: Unknown; Referee: Morgan Kullberg (Mora)
