= Linus Tornblad =

Swedish footballer (born 1993)

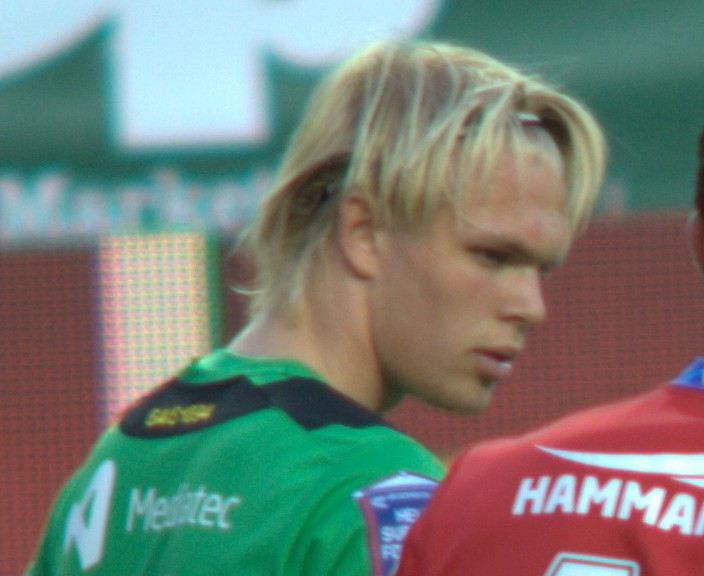
- Tornbald in 2013

Personal information
- Full name: Linus Tornblad
- Date of birth: 2 July 1993 (age 33)
- Place of birth: Sweden
- Height: 1.80 m (5 ft 11 in)
- Position: Forward

Team information
- Current team: IK Oddevold
- Number: 9

Youth career
- 2001–2008: Azalea BK
- 2009–2011: GAIS

Senior career*
| Years | Team | Apps | (Gls) |
| 2010–2015 | GAIS | 81 | (8) |
| 2016 | Ljungskile SK | 23 | (3) |
| 2017 | Åtvidabergs FF | 6 | (0) |
| 2018 | Norrby IF | 4 | (0) |
| 2019 | Örgryte IS | 5 | (0) |
| 2019 | Utsiktens BK | 10 | (1) |
| 2021 | Qviding FIF | 27 | (4) |
| 2022 | Ljungskile SK | 24 | (10) |
| 2023– | IK Oddevold | 72 | (13) |

International career
| 2012 | Sweden U19 | 2 | (0) |
- * Club domestic league appearances and goals as of 21 July 2026

Linus Tornblad (born 2 July 1993) is a Swedish footballer who plays for IK Oddevold as a forward.
