= Ängö BK =

Swedish football club

- Full name: Ängö Bollklubb
- Founded: 2010
- Ground: Fredriksskans; Kalmar; Sweden
- League: Division 4 Småland sydöstra
Home colours

Ängö BK is a Swedish football club located in Kalmar.

== Background ==
Ängö BK currently plays in Div 4 Elit Södra Småland sydöstra which is the fifth tier of Swedish football. They play their home matches at the Fredriksskans in Kalmar.

The club is affiliated to Smålands Fotbollförbund.
