= Linus Werneman =

Swedish ice hockey player

- Born: June 4, 1992 (age 32); Luleå, Sweden
- Height: 5 ft 9 in (175 cm)
- Weight: 176 lb (80 kg; 12 st 8 lb)
- Position: Forward
- Shoots: Left
- team: Free Agent
- Played for: Timrå IK
- Playing career: 2010–present

Linus Werneman (born June 4, 1992) is a Swedish professional ice hockey player. A smallish very strong winger with good speed and impressive technical skills. Really noticeable on the ice with his creativity. Has a really hard shot and potential to become a pretty high scoring player. Works pretty hard too and does not ignore his defensive responsibilities. Played Elitserien for Timrå IK as a junior and scored twice against Djurgårdens IF.
