= Martin Claesson =

Swedish footballer

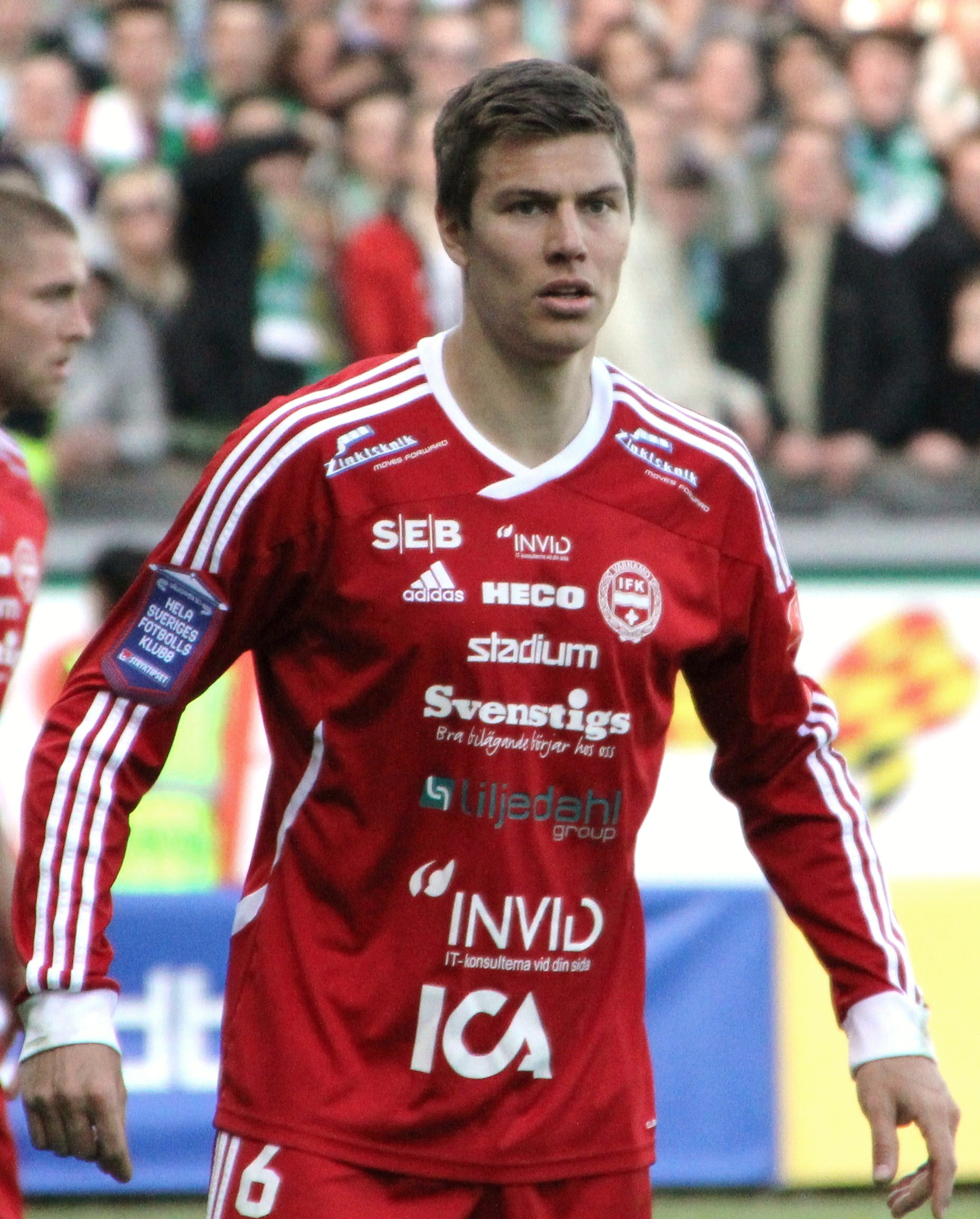

Personal information
- Full name: Martin Claesson
- Date of birth: 20 September 1983 (age 43)
- Place of birth: Sweden
- Height: 1.86 m (6 ft 1 in)
- Position: Defender

Team information
- Current team: IFK Värnamo
- Number: 6

Youth career
- IFK Värnamo

Senior career*
Years	Team	Apps	(Gls)
2004	IFK Värnamo		
2005–2007	Östers IF	19	(1)
2008–	IFK Värnamo	111	(16)
- * Club domestic league appearances and goals as of 23 October 2012

Martin Claesson (born 20 September 1983) is a Swedish footballer who plays for IFK Värnamo as a defender. He is the older brother of Viktor Claesson.
