= Valsta Syrianska IK =

Defunct association football club in Sweden

- Full name: Valsta Syrianska Idrotts- och Kulturförening
- Founded: 1993
- Dissolved: 2015
- Ground: Midgårdsvallen, Märsta; Stockholm; Sweden
- Capacity: 2,400
Home colours	Away colours

Valsta Syrianska IK was a Swedish based football club in Märsta, a suburb of Stockholm. The club was established in 1993 by Syriac immigrants arriving from Turkey. The club became defunct in 2015.

== History ==
Valsta Syrianska IK was established in 1993 in Märsta, Stockholm. The club was formed following the merger of Valsta IK (Division 6 team) and the Syrianska association. The new club started in Division 6 and progressed through the Swedish football league system winning Division 6 in 1994, Division 5 in 1996, Division 4 in 1997 and Division 3 in 2000. Since 2006 the club has played in Division 1 Norra, the third tier of Swedish football until they were relegated to Division 2 after the 2011 season.

On 15 February 2015 it was announced that the club had reached bankruptcy, resulting in a withdrawal from the Swedish league system.

== Season to season ==
Season	Level	Division	Section	Position	Movements
1998	Tier 4	Division 3	Norra Svealand	9th	
1999	Tier 4	Division 3	Norra Svealand	3rd	
2000	Tier 4	Division 3	Norra Svealand	1st	Promoted
2001	Tier 3	Division 2	Östra Svealand	6th	
2002	Tier 3	Division 2	Östra Svealand	3rd	
2003	Tier 3	Division 2	Östra Svealand	2nd	
2004	Tier 3	Division 2	Östra Svealand	3rd	
2005	Tier 3	Division 2	Norra Svealand	4th	Promoted
2006*	Tier 3	Division 1	Norra	7th	
2007	Tier 3	Division 1	Norra	12th	
2008	Tier 3	Division 1	Norra	6th	
2009	Tier 3	Division 1	Norra	3rd	
2010	Tier 3	Division 1	Norra	9th	
2011	Tier 3	Division 1	Norra	12th	Relegated
2012	Tier 4	Division 2	Norra Svealand	1st	Promoted
2013	Tier 3	Division 1	Norra	9th	
2014	Tier 3	Division 1	Norra	13th	Relegated

* League restructuring in 2006 resulted in a new division being created at Tier 3 and subsequent divisions dropping a level.

== Attendances ==
Valsta Syrianska IK have had the following average attendances:

Season	Average attendance	Division / Section	Level
2005	131	Div 2 Norra Svealand	Tier 3
2006	343	Div 1 Norra	Tier 3
2007	438	Div 1 Norra	Tier 3
2008	342	Div 1 Norra	Tier 3
2009	365	Div 1 Norra	Tier 3
2010	282	Div 1 Norra	Tier 3
2011	402	Div 1 Norra	Tier 3
2012	250	Div 2 Norra Svealand	Tier 4

* Attendances are provided in the Publikliga sections of the Svenska Fotbollförbundet website.

== See also ==
- List of Assyrian-Syriac football teams in Sweden
