= Hovslätts IK =

Swedish football club

- Full name: Hovslätts Idrottsklubb
- Founded: 1929
- Ground: Hovet; Jönköping; Sweden
- Chairman: Herbert Kruspel
- Head coach: Thomas Jonsson
- League: Division 3 Nordöstra Götaland
- 2010: Division 4 Småland Elit Västra, 1st (promoted)
Home colours

Hovslätts IK is a Swedish football club located in Jönköping.

== Background ==
Hovslätts Idrottsklubb was formed in 1929 as a sports club serving the settlement of Hovslätt in Jönköping Municipality. The club has sections covering football, bandy, floorball, gymnastics and athletics.

Since their foundation, Hovslätts IK has participated mainly in the lower divisions of the Swedish football league system. The club currently plays in Division 3 Nordöstra Götaland which is the fifth tier of Swedish football. They play their home matches at the Hovet in Jönköping.

Hovslätts IK is affiliated to Smålands Fotbollförbund.

== Recent history ==
In recent seasons Hovslätts IK has competed in the following divisions:

2011 - Division III, Nordöstra Götaland
2010 - Division IV, Småland Elit Västra
2009 - Division IV, Småland Elit Västra
2008 - Division IV, Småland Elit Västra
2007 - Division III, Nordöstra Götaland
2006 - Division IV, Småland Norra Elit
2005 - Division IV, Småland Västra Elit
2004 - Division IV, Småland Västra Elit
2003 - Division IV, Småland Nordvästra
2002 - Division V, Småland Nordvästra
2001 - Division V, Småland Nordvästra
2000 - Division V, Småland Nordvästra
1999 - Division V, Småland Nordvästra

== Attendances ==
In recent seasons Hovslätts IK has had the following average attendances:

Season	Average attendance	Division / Section	Level
2006	Not available	Div 4 Småland Elit Västra	Tier 6
2007	178	Div 3 Nordöstra Götaland	Tier 5
2008	Not available	Div 4 Småland Elit Västra	Tier 6
2009	170	Div 4 Småland Elit Västra	Tier 6
2010	100	Div 4 Småland Elit Västra	Tier 6

* Attendances are provided in the Publikliga sections of the Svenska Fotbollförbundet website.
