= Dinko Felić =

Bosnian-born Norwegian footballer (born 1983)

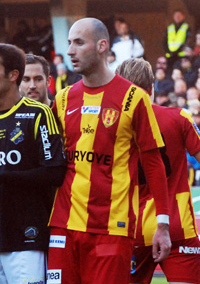

Personal information
- Full name: Dinko Felić
- Date of birth: 10 November 1983 (age 42)
- Place of birth: SR Bosnia and Herzegovina, SFR Yugoslavia
- Height: 1.98 m (6 ft 6 in)
- Position: Forward

Youth career
- 1995–1999: Vågå IL
- 1999–2002: Kongsvinger

Senior career*
Years	Team	Apps	(Gls)
2002–2003	Kongsvinger	31	(1)
2004–2006	Enköpings SK	12	(0)
2007–2016	Syrianska FC	190	(31)
2016–2018	FC Linköping City	29	(6)
2018–2019	AFK Linköping	21	(2)
2019–2021	Malmslätts AIK		
- * Club domestic league appearances and goals as of 7 May 2023

Dinko Felić (born 10 November 1983) is a Bosnian-born Norwegian footballer who plays as a forward.

Felić was born in Bosnia but his family relocated to Norway when he was twelve and settled down in Vågå Municipality. In 1999, he moved to Kongsvinger to attend a school which focused on football. There he also joined the local club Kongsvinger IL where he eventually played two seasons with the first team.

In 2004, he moved to Sweden where he signed for Enköpings SK who were playing in second tier Superettan at the time but was relegated that same year and Felić spent the remaining two seasons with the club in the Swedish third tier. During his years in Enköping he was often referred to as "The Zlatan Ibrahimović of Uppland".

In 2007 he moved to Syrianska FC, remaining with the club for nearly nine years and playing three seasons in the Allsvenskan, the top division of Swedish football.

After leaving Syrianska, Felić played for three lower division clubs in Linköping. He has since taken on a coaching role at Mjölby AI FF, but left in late 2022.

== Career statistics ==
As of 21 June 2015

Season	Club	Division	League		Cup		Total	
Season	Club	Division	Apps	Goals	Apps	Goals	Apps	Goals
2008	Syrianska FC	Division 1	23	7	0	0	23	7
2009	Syrianska FC	Superettan	21	1	2	1	23	2
2010	Syrianska FC	Superettan	28	3	0	0	28	3
2011	Syrianska FC	Allsvenskan	25	2	0	0	25	2
2012	Syrianska FC	Allsvenskan	29	8	1	1	30	9
2013	Syrianska FC	Allsvenskan	28	5	3	1	31	6
2014	Syrianska FC	Superettan	24	4	0	0	24	4
2015	Syrianska FC	Superettan	24	1	0	0	24	1
Career Total			190	31	6	3	221	34
