= Joakim Karlsson (footballer) =

Swedish footballer

Personal information
- Date of birth: 4 February 1989 (age 37)
- Place of birth: Orrefors, Sweden
- Height: 1.85 m (6 ft 1 in)
- Position: Midfielder

Youth career
- Orrefors IF
- 2005–2019: Kalmar FF

Senior career*
Years	Team	Apps	(Gls)
2009–2010	Kalmar FF	2	(0)
2011	Kristianstads FF	22	(0)
2012–2019	Jönköpings Södra IF	176	(2)
2020	Örgryte IS	16	(0)
- * Club domestic league appearances and goals as of 5 December 2020

Joakim Karlsson (born 4 February 1989) is a Swedish footballer who plays as a midfielder.

== Career ==
=== Club career ===
On 27 December 2019 Örgryte IS confirmed, that Karlsson had joined the club on a deal until the end of 2021.
