= Sinan Ayrancı =

Turkish-Swedish footballer

Personal information
- Full name: Ali Sinan Ayrancı
- Date of birth: 9 July 1990 (age 36)
- Place of birth: Stockholm, Sweden
- Height: 1.90 m (6 ft 3 in)
- Position: Forward

Team information
- Current team: FK Bosna 08

Youth career
- IF Brommapojkarna

Senior career*
Years	Team	Apps	(Gls)
2008–2009	IF Brommapojkarna	22	(2)
2009–2011	Gençlerbirliği	0	(0)
2010	→ IF Brommapojkarna (loan)	10	(2)
2011–2015	Hammarby Fotboll	39	(7)
2013	→ Östersunds FK (loan)	9	(2)
2014	→ Varbergs BoIS FC (loan)	15	(1)
2015–	FK Bosna 08		

International career
2009	Sweden U19	2	(0)
- * Club domestic league appearances and goals as of 23 November 2013

Sinan Ayrancı (born 9 July 1990 in Sweden, Stockholm) is a Turkish-Swedish footballer currently playing for FK Bosna 08 in the Swedish amateur division. He previously played for Hammarby Fotboll and IF Brommapojkarna in Sweden and Gençlerbirliği in the Turkcell Super League.

He played for the Sweden men's national under-19 football team during 2009.
