= Ärentuna SK =

Swedish football club

- Full name: Ärentuna Sportklubb
- Ground: Ärentuna IP; Uppsala; Sweden
- League: Division 4 Uppland

Ärentuna SK is a Swedish football club located in Uppsala.

== Background ==
Ärentuna SK currently plays in Division 4 Uppland which is the sixth tier of Swedish football. They play their home matches at the Ärentuna IP in Uppsala.

The club is affiliated to Upplands Fotbollförbund.
