= Motala Idrottspark =

Sports ground in Motala, Sweden

Coordinates: 58°32′23″N 15°3′14″E

Motala IP
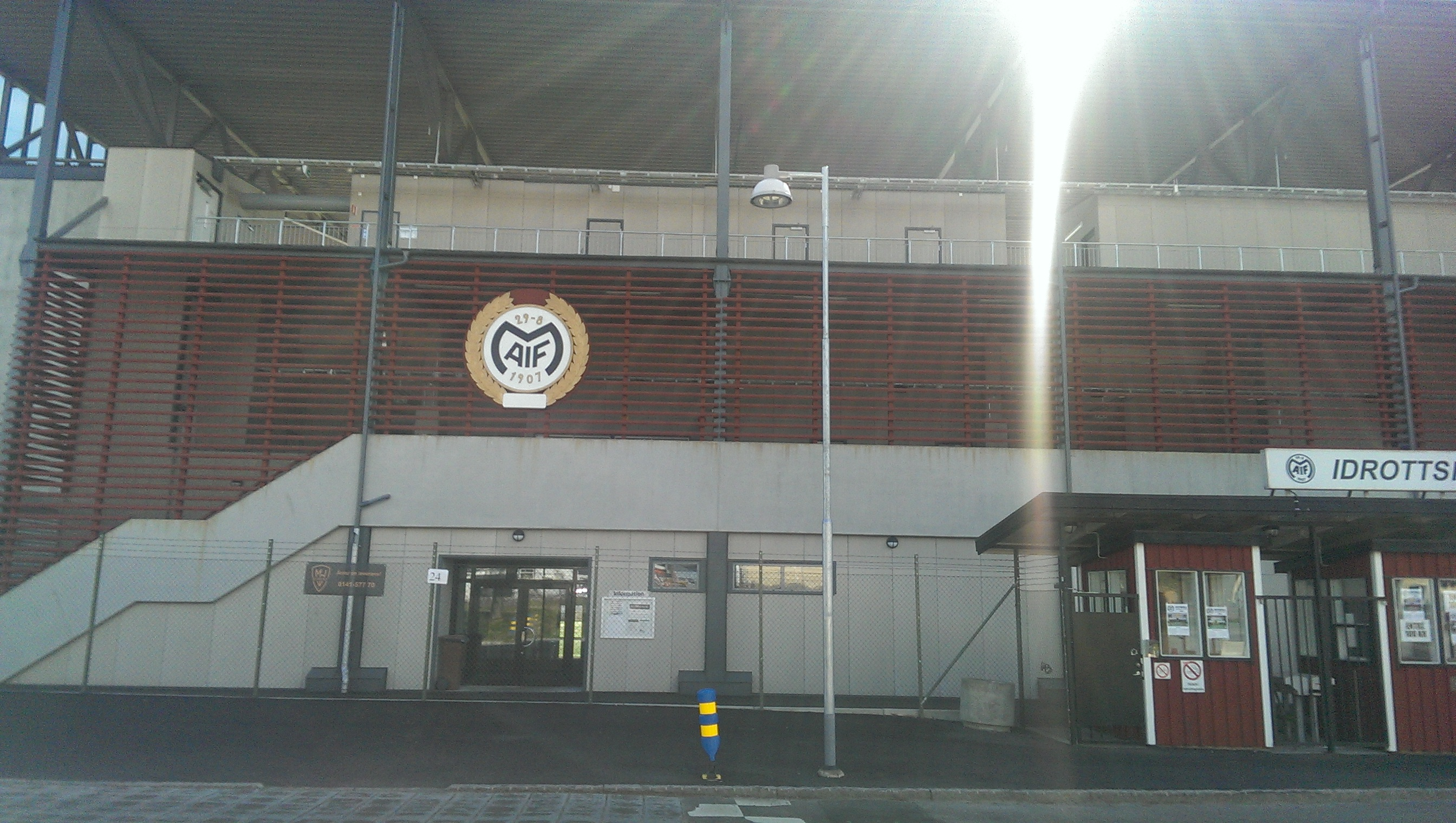
- Interactive map of Motala IP
- Location: Motala, Sweden
- Capacity: 8 500

Construction
- Renovated: 1920

Tenant
- Motala AIF

Motala Idrottspark is a football stadium in Motala, Sweden and the home stadium for the football team Motala AIF. Motala Idrottspark has a total capacity of 8,500 spectators.
