= Edsborgs IP =

Football stadium in Trollhättan, Sweden

Coordinates: 58°17′22″N 12°18′40″E

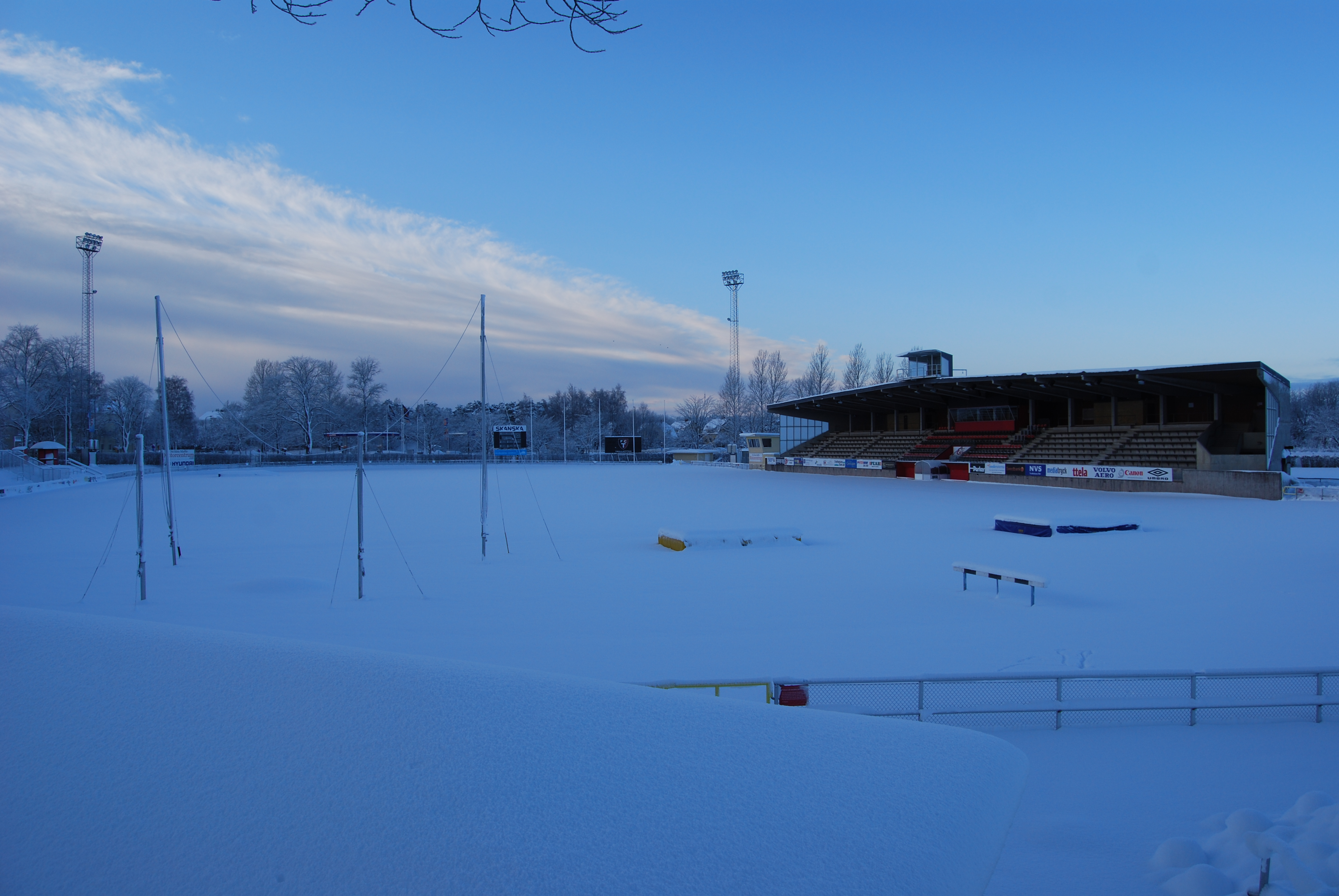
Edsborgs IP in January

Edsborgs IP is a football stadium in Trollhättan, and the home arena for FC Trollhättan. Edsborgs IP has a total capacity of 5,100 spectators.
