= Skogsvallen =

Sports ground in Luleå, Sweden

Coordinates: 65°35′57.51″N 22°09′42.60″E

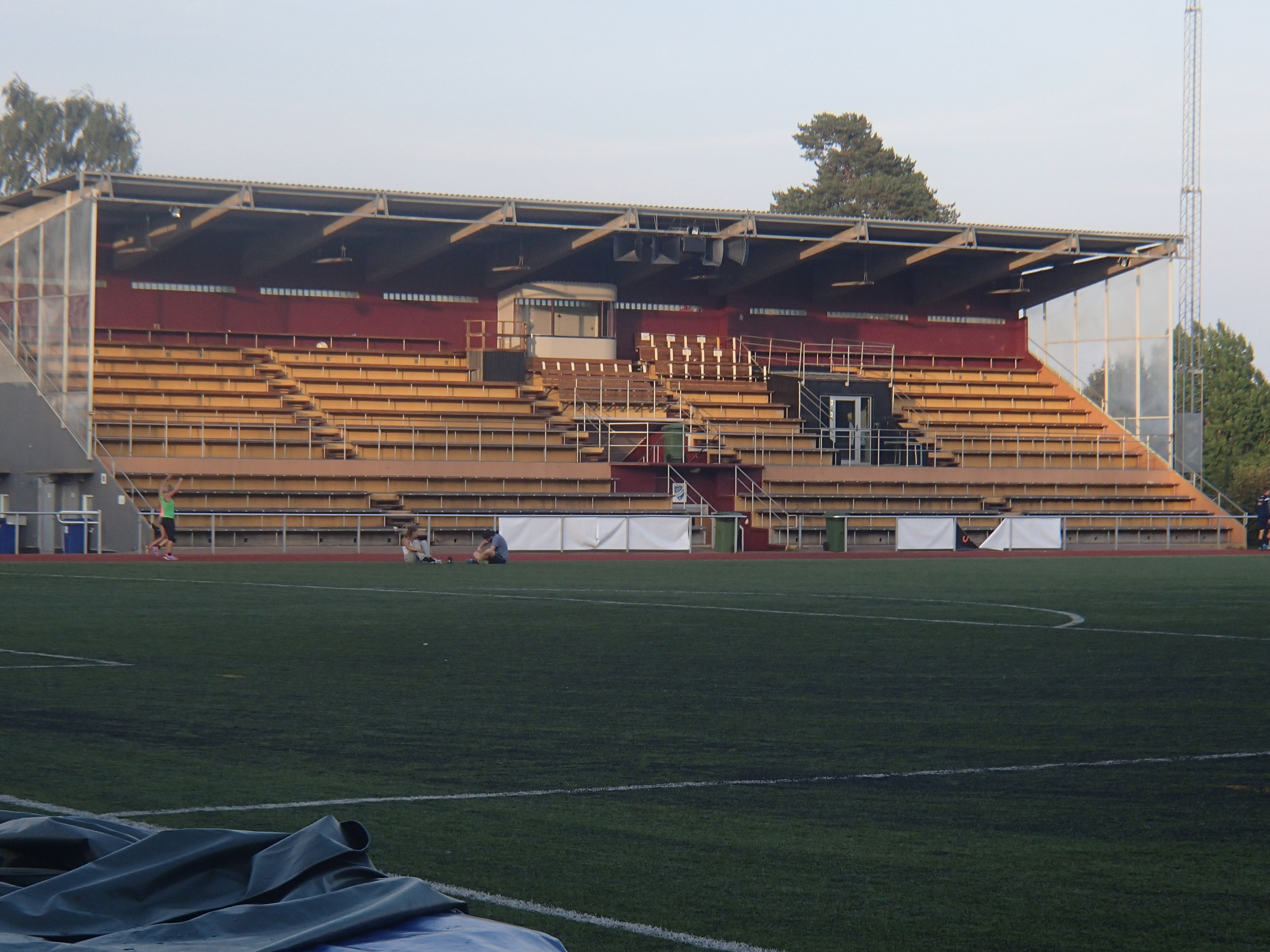
- Skogsvallen eastern stand
- Interactive map of Skogsvallen
- Location: Luleå, Sweden
- Owner: Luleå Municipality
- Type: sports ground

Construction
- Opened: 1957

Tenant
- IFK Luleå

Skogsvallen is a sports ground in Luleå, Sweden, and the home stadium for the football team IFK Luleå. It was inaugurated in 1957.

Skogsvallen has a total capacity of 2,500 spectators. It was an Allsvenskan venue for one season in 1971 when IFK Luleå played in the top-tier league.
