= Torslandavallen =

Football stadium in Torslanda, Sweden

Coordinates: 57°43′4″N 11°45′39″E

Torslandavallen is a football stadium in Torslanda, Sweden and the home stadium for the football team Torslanda IK. Torslandavallen has a total capacity of 1,500 spectators.
