= Qviding FIF =

Swedish football club

- Full name: Qviding Fräntorps; Idrottsförening
- Founded: 1987
- Ground: Valhalla IP, Gothenburg
- Capacity: 4,000
- Manager: Henrik Fridolvsson
- League: Division 1 Södra
- 2019: Division 2 Västra Götaland, 1st ▲
Home colours	Away colours

Qviding FIF is a Swedish football club located in Gothenburg. The club was formed October 1987 following a merger of the BK Qviding and Fräntorps IF clubs. Qviding FIF is currently playing in Division 1 Södra.

In recent years the club has had 4 seasons in the Superettan. Qviding FIF are affiliated to the Göteborgs Fotbollförbund.

Valhalla IP has been their home ground since 2008, having previously played at Torpavallen.

== Season to season ==
Season	Level	Division	Section	Position	Movements
1993	Tier 4	Division 3	Nordvästra Götaland	3rd	
1994	Tier 4	Division 3	Nordvästra Götaland	2nd	Promoted
1995	Tier 3	Division 2	Västra Götaland	2nd	
1996	Tier 3	Division 2	Västra Götaland	2nd	
1997	Tier 3	Division 2	Västra Götaland	5th	
1998	Tier 3	Division 2	Västra Götaland	5th	
1999	Tier 3	Division 2	Västra Götaland	8th	
2000	Tier 3	Division 2	Västra Götaland	2nd	
2001	Tier 3	Division 2	Västra Götaland	5th	
2002	Tier 3	Division 2	Västra Götaland	3rd	
2003	Tier 3	Division 2	Västra Götaland	7th	
2004	Tier 3	Division 2	Västra Götaland	7th	
2005	Tier 3	Division 2	Västra Götaland	1st	Promotion Playoffs – Promoted
2006*	Tier 2	Superettan		15th	Relegated
2007	Tier 3	Division 1	Södra	1st	Promoted
2008	Tier 2	Superettan		10th	
2009	Tier 2	Superettan		14th	Relegation Playoffs – Relegated
2010	Tier 3	Division 1	Södra	2nd	Promotion Playoffs
2011	Tier 2	Superettan		16th	Relegated
2012	Tier 3	Division 1	Södra	9th	
2013	Tier 3	Division 1	Södra	8th	
2014	Tier 3	Division 1	Södra	8th	
2015	Tier 3	Division 1	Södra	9th	
2016	Tier 3	Division 1	Södra	9th	
2017	Tier 3	Division 1	Södra	13th	Relegated Two Levels Due To Bankruptcy
2018	Tier 5	Division 3	Nordvästra Götaland	1st	Promoted
2019	Tier 4	Division 2	Västra Götaland	1st	Promoted
2020	Tier 3	Division 1	Södra	12th	

* League restructuring in 2006 resulted in a new division being created at Tier 3 and subsequent divisions dropping a level.

== Attendances ==
In recent seasons Qviding FIF have had the following average attendances:

Season	Average attendance	Division / Section	Level
2007	315	Div 1 Södra	Tier 3
2008	624	Superettan	Tier 2
2009	462	Superettan	Tier 2
2010	239	Div 1 Södra	Tier 3
2011	482	Superettan	Tier 2
2012	470	Div 1 Södra	Tier 3
2013	137	Div 1 Södra	Tier 3
2014	408	Div 1 Södra	Tier 3
2015	291	Div 1 Södra	Tier 3
2016	359	Div 1 Södra	Tier 3
2017	321	Div 1 Södra	Tier 3
2018	?	Div 3 Nordvästra Götaland	Tier 5
2019	?	Div 3 Västra Götaland	Tier 5
2020		Div 1 Södra	Tier 3

* Attendances are provided in the Publikliga sections of the Svenska Fotbollförbundet website.

== Current squad ==
As of 16 April 2017

Note: Flags indicate national team as defined under FIFA eligibility rules; some limited exceptions apply. Players may hold more than one non-FIFA nationality.

No.	Pos.	Nation	Player
1	GK	SWE	Rasmus Iversen
3	DF	SWE	Rickard Hansson
4	MF	SWE	Besim Alimi
5	DF	THA	August Gustafsson Lohaprasert
6	MF	SWE	Linus Ohlsson
7	DF	SWE	Nikola Jevrić
9	FW	KOS	Fuad Hyseni
10	MF	SWE	William Kenndal
11	MF	SWE	August Wängberg
12	GK	SWE	Jonathan Beckman

No.	Pos.	Nation	Player
14	FW	SWE	Malik Koné
15	MF	SWE	Oscar Ehner
16	MF	SWE	Arvid Bergman Lövborg
17	FW	SWE	Bita Bångens
18	FW	SWE	Gustav Hedlund
19	DF	SWE	Anton Olsson
22	FW	SWE	Jesper Jörnvik
24	DF	SWE	Gustav Kadura
27	FW	SWE	Bryan Johansson

== Achievements ==
=== League ===
- Division 1 Södra:
  - Winners (1): 2007
  - Runners-up (1): 2010
