= FC Trollhättan =

Swedish football club

- Full name: Football Club Trollhättan
- Founded: 2001; 25 years ago
- Ground: Edsborgs IP, Trollhättan
- Capacity: 5,100
- Chairman: Sven-Olof Frisk
- Manager: Vigan Berbatovci
- League: Ettan Södra
- 2026: Ettan Södra, 10th of 16
Home colours

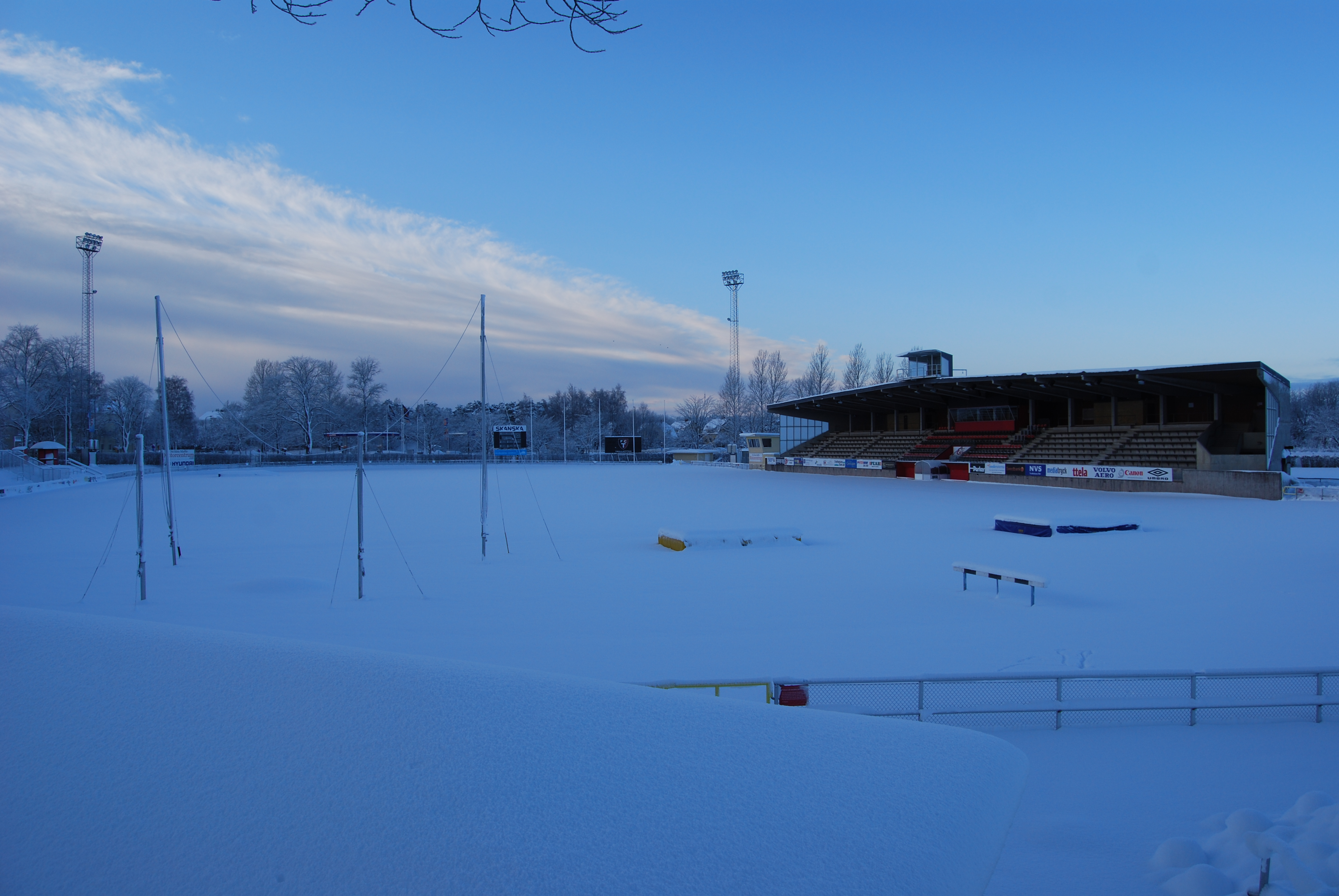
Edsborgs IP

FC Trollhättan is a Swedish football club located in Trollhättan currently playing in Division 1.

== Background ==
The club was founded in 2001, when the old rivals Trollhättans IF and Trollhättans FK decided to merge.

In their first ever league match against Ljungskile SK at Skarsjövallen on April 22, 2002, in Division II (Sweden's third league at that time), they won 1–0. The historic goal scorer was Michel Berndtsson when he scored the game winner in the 79th minute.

In their first ever home game, April 28, 2002, against Askims IK, FCT won 1–0. A local newspaper Trollhättans tidning paid for all the spectators; the attendance was 3,083 people.

On June 6, 2002, the supporter club FCT Black Support was founded.

On September 26, 2002, FCT defeated Askims IK with a score of 3–1, that secured the league win, and qualification against Falkenbergs FF awaited for a place in Superettan in a double-meeting. On October 12, 2002, the home game against Falkenberg resulted in a 3–2 win. A week later on October 19, FCT was promoted to Superettan when Henrik Bertilsson (former Allsvenskan and professional player) headed in the 2–1 goal.

At the beginning of the 2004 season, Jonas Olsson took over as coach and remained in that position until the 2006 season ended. His successor Lars-Olof Mattsson has coached the Swedish U21 team, Degerfors IF and Ljungskile SK, when they won promotion to Allsvenskan for their first time in 1996.

== Season to season ==
Season	Level	Division	Section	Position	Movements
2002	Tier 3	Division 2	Västra Götaland	1st	Promotion Playoffs
2003	Tier 3	Division 2	Västra Götaland	5th	
2004	Tier 3	Division 2	Västra Götaland	4th	
2005	Tier 3	Division 2	Västra Götaland	2nd	Promoted
2006*	Tier 3	Ettan	Södra	7th	
2007	Tier 3	Ettan	Södra	6th	
2008	Tier 3	Ettan	Södra	1st	Promoted
2009	Tier 2	Superettan		13th	Relegation Playoffs
2010	Tier 2	Superettan		15th	Relegated
2011	Tier 3	Ettan	Södra	9th	
2012	Tier 3	Ettan1	Södra	5th	
2013	Tier 3	Ettan	Södra	6th	
2014	Tier 3	Ettan	Södra	12th	Relegated
2015	Tier 4	Division 2	Norra Götaland	1st	Promoted
2016	Tier 3	Ettan	Södra	11th	Relegated
2017	Tier 4	Division 2	Norra Götaland	2nd	Promotion Playoffs
2018	Tier 4	Division 2	Norra Götaland	2nd	Promotion Playoffs, Promoted
2019	Tier 3	Ettan	Södra	5th	
2020	Tier 3	Ettan	Södra	7th	
2021	Tier 3	Ettan	Södra	4th	
2022	Tier 3	Ettan	Södra	4th	
2023	Tier 3	Ettan	Södra	5th	
2024	Tier 3	Ettan	Södra	6th	
2025	Tier 3	Ettan	Södra	7th	

* League restructuring in 2006 resulted in a new division being created at Tier 3 and subsequent divisions dropping a level.

== Current squad ==
As of 1 September 2026

Note: Flags indicate national team as defined under FIFA eligibility rules; some limited exceptions apply. Players may hold more than one non-FIFA nationality.

No.	Pos.	Nation	Player
1	GK	SWE	Jimmy Henriksson
2	DF	SWE	Casper Ekdahl Filipsson
3	DF	SWE	Albian Gashi
5	DF	SWE	Nils Svensson
6	MF	SWE	William Jensen
7	FW	SWE	Chisomnazu Chika Chidi
8	MF	SWE	Oliver Campo Hägglund
9	FW	SWE	Destiny Chibeze Eze
10	MF	SWE	Amadou-David Sanyang
11	MF	SWE	Daniel Burubwa
13	FW	SWE	Melwin Berg

No.	Pos.	Nation	Player
14	MF	SWE	Tyler Sernling
15	DF	SWE	Vilmer Johansson (on loan from IFK Göteborg)
16	DF	SWE	Simon Banous
17	FW	SWE	Valter Hermansson
18	MF	BIH	Semir Bosnić
19	DF	SWE	Philip Sterner
20	MF	SWE	Wilmer Henriksson (on loan from IFK Göteborg)
22	MF	SWE	Abdirsak Hassan
25	GK	SWE	Armin Ibrahimović
-	GK	SWE	Kristan Marinković (on loan from BK Häcken)

== Achievements ==
=== League ===
- Division 1
  - Winners (1): 2008
- Division 2
  - Winners (2): 2002, 2015
