= Linus Malmborg =

Swedish footballer

Personal information
- Full name: Linus Malmborg
- Date of birth: 16 February 1988 (age 38)
- Place of birth: Sweden
- Height: 1.91 m (6 ft 3 in)
- Position: Defender

Youth career
- Djurgårdens IF

Senior career*
Years	Team	Apps	(Gls)
2005–2007	Östers IF	0	(0)
2006	→ IFK Värnamo (loan)	16	(1)
2008–2009	IFK Värnamo	48	(3)
2010–2011	Vasalunds IF	48	(3)
2012–2013	Gefle IF	14	(0)
2013	→ Assyriska FF (loan)	28	(0)
2013–2016	Assyriska FF	91	(1)
2017–2018	Vasalunds IF	26	(2)
- * Club domestic league appearances and goals as of 4 February 2019

Linus Malmborg (born 16 February 1988) is a Swedish footballer who plays as a defender, most recently for Vasalunds IF.
