= Midgårdsvallen =

Football and track & field stadium in Märsta, Sweden

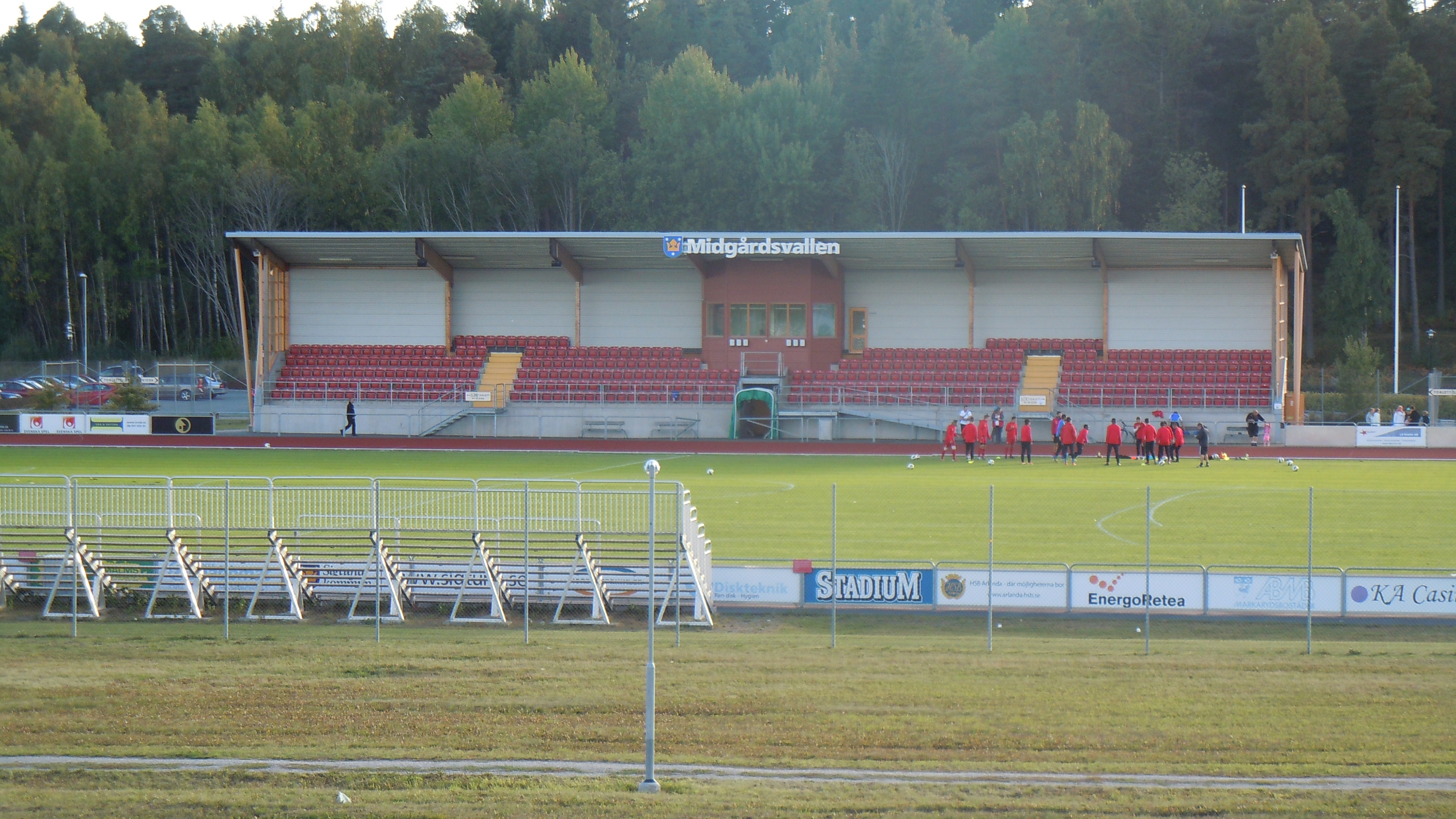
- Interactive map of Midgårdsvallen
- Location: Märsta
- Coordinates: 59°37′14″N 17°50′13″E
- Owner: Sigtuna Municipality
- Capacity: 2,400
- Surface: Natural grass
- Record attendance: 3,125 (Valsta Syrianska IK-Hammarby Fotboll, 24 July 2008)
- Field size: 105 x 65 meters

Construction
- Built: 2004–2005
- Opened: 2005

Midgårdsvallen is a football and track & field stadium in Märsta, Sweden. The stadium was opened in 2005. The natural grass pitch measures 105 x 65 meters. Currently the Midgårdsvallen stadium is approved for Superettan, but additional flood lights can be installed for Allsvenskan level. The all-weather tracks has IAAF approved surfaces. Midgårdsvallen has a total capacity of 2,400 spectators. The main stand is covered and seats 400.

The complex also includes a heated artificial turf football pitch and another artificial turf pitch for American Football.
