= Rosvalla IP =

Football stadium in Nyköping, Sweden

Coordinates: 58°44′56″N 17°2′16″E

Rosvalla IP is a multi-purpose stadium, in Nyköping, Sweden and the home stadium for the football team Nyköpings BIS. Rosvalla IP has a total capacity of 3,000 spectators.
