= Kristianstads IP =

Football stadium in Kristianstad, Sweden

Coordinates: 56°1′22″N 14°9′57″E

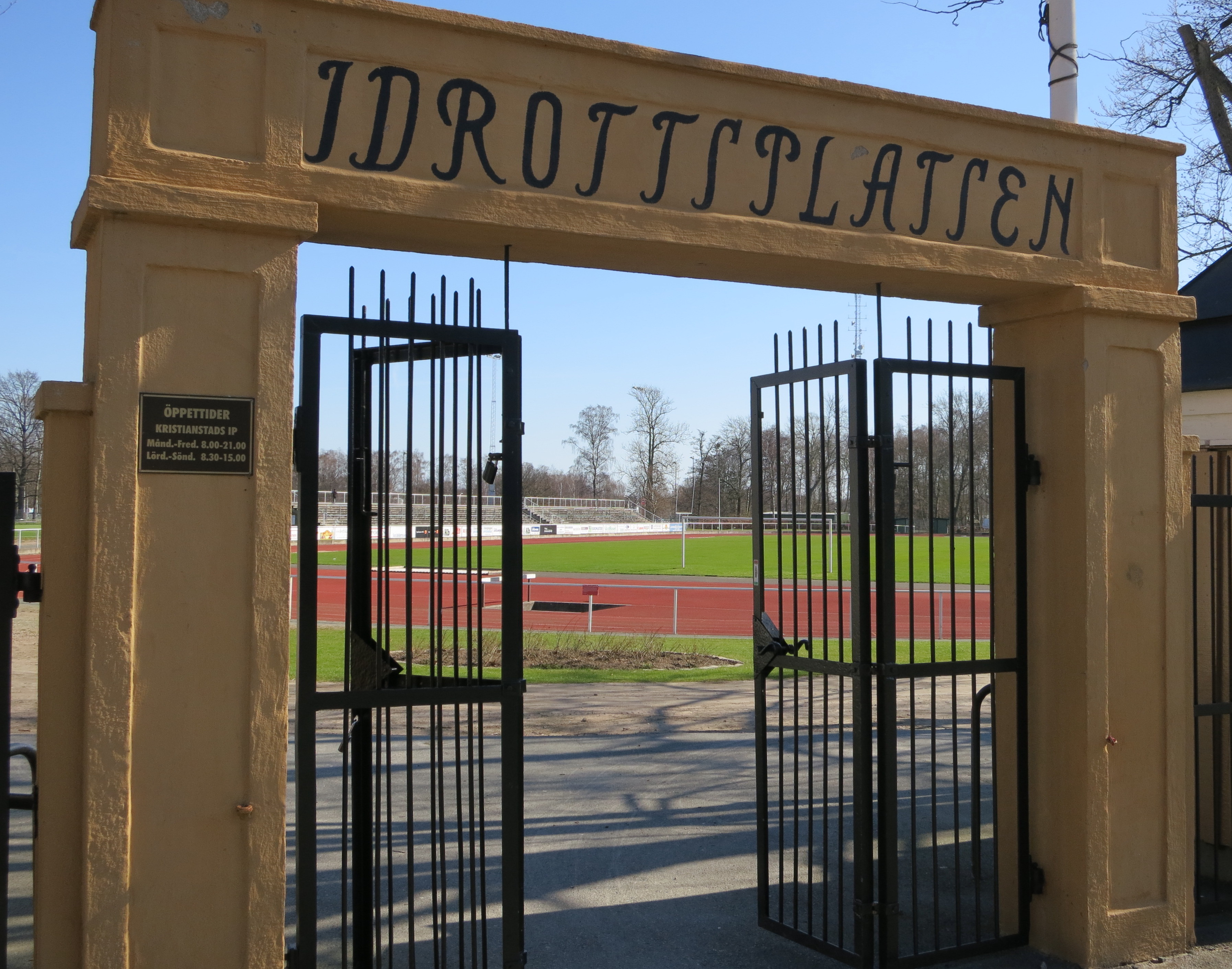
The entrance

Kristianstads IP is a football stadium in Kristianstad, Sweden. Kristianstads IP has a total capacity of 6,000 spectators.
