= Södermalms IP =

Sports venue in Skövde, Sweden

Coordinates: 58°22′44″N 13°50′26″E

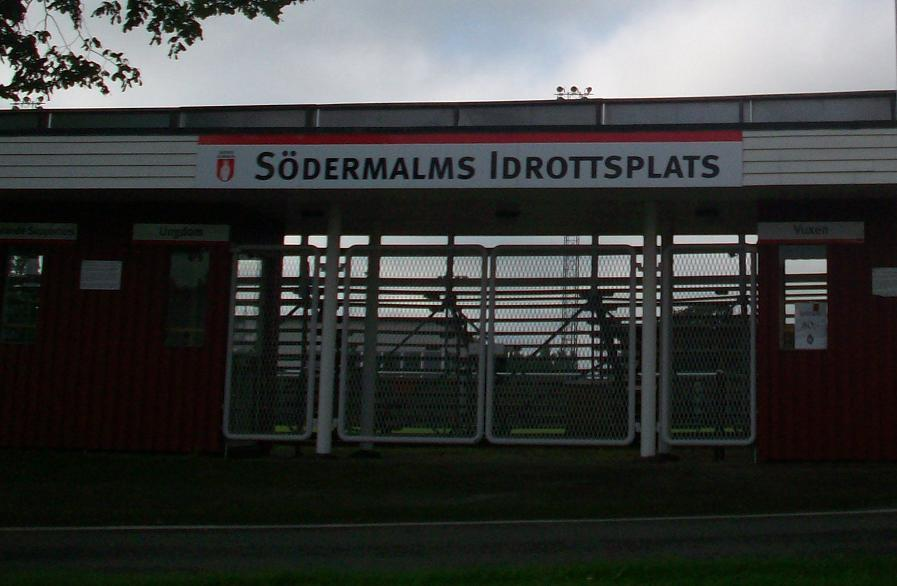

Södermalms IP is a football stadium in Skövde, Sweden and the home stadium for the football team Skövde AIK. Södermalms IP has a total capacity of 4,646 spectators.
