= Chidi Omeje =

Nigerian footballer

Personal information
- Full name: Chidi Dauda Omeje
- Date of birth: 5 May 1990 (age 36)
- Place of birth: Enugu, Nigeria
- Height: 1.88 m (6 ft 2 in)
- Position: Forward

Team information
- Current team: IFK Östersund
- Number: 25

Youth career
- 2005–2008: Vejle Football Academy
- 2008–2009: Vejle Boldklub

Senior career*
Years	Team	Apps	(Gls)
2009–2011	Vejle Boldklub	19	(4)
2011–2014	Dalkurd FF	75	(43)
2015–2017	AFC Eskilstuna	54	(17)
2018–2019	GIF Sundsvall	5	(0)
2020–2021	AFC Eskilstuna	30	(5)
2022–2023	Östavalls IF	16	(6)
2023–	IFK Östersund	6	(2)
- * Club domestic league appearances and goals as of 19:38, 1 April 2024 (UTC)

Chidi Dauda Omeje // (born 5 May 1990 in Enugu) is a Nigerian professional football player who currently plays for Swedish Division 2 side IFK Östersund.
