= 2014–15 Svenska Cupen =

Tournament details
- Country: Sweden
- Dates: 3 June 2014 – 17 May 2015
- Teams: 113 (including qualifying); 96 (competition proper)

Final positions
- Champions: IFK Göteborg
- Runners-up: Örebro SK

Tournament statistics
- Matches played: 119
- Goals scored: 448 (3.76 per match)
- Top goal scorer(s): Lasse Vibe; Richard Yarsuvat (7 goals)

The 2014–15 Svenska Cupen was the 59th season of Svenska Cupen and the third season with the current format. The winners of the competition earned a place in the second qualifying round of the 2015–16 UEFA Europa League. If they had already qualified for European competition, in which case the qualification spot will go to fourth placed team of the 2014 Allsvenskan.

A total of 96 clubs entered the competition. IF Elfsborg are the defending champions, having beaten Helsingborgs IF 1–0 in last season's final. The final was played on 17 May 2015. The final venue will be selected through a draw between the two finalists. This is a return to a format that was used between 2007 and 2011.

IFK Göteborg won their seventh Svenska Cupen title on 17 May 2015 after defeating Örebro SK 2–1.

== Teams ==
Round	Clubs remaining	Clubs involved	Winners from previous round	New entries this round	Leagues entering at this round
Qualifying rounds	113	20	none	20	Division 1 (3 teams); Division 2 (2 teams); Division 3 (5 teams); Division 4 (7 teams); Division 5 (2 teams); Division 6 (1 team)
Round 1	96	64	3	61	Division 1 (18 teams); Division 2 (23 teams); Division 3 (11 teams); Division 4 (8 teams); Division 6 (1 team)
Round 2	64	64	32	32	Allsvenskan; Superettan
Group stage	32	32	32	none	none
Quarter-finals	8	8	8	none	none
Semi-finals	4	4	4	none	none
Final	2	2	2	none	none

== Qualifying rounds ==
The only two associations of the Swedish District Football Associations that had a qualifying tournament were Dalarnas FF and Örebro Läns FF, with the teams from other districts being determined though district championships or by club ranking in 2013.

== Round 1 ==
64 teams from the third tier or lower of the Swedish league system competed in this round. The round started on 3 June 2014 and finished on 6 August. The number in brackets indicates what tier of Swedish football each team competed in during the 2014 season. Wollmars FF was the lowest-ranked team in this round, competing in Division 6, the eight tier of Swedish football.

3 June 2014	Kungsbacka IF (6)	2–3	Sävedalens IF (4)	Kungsbacka
19:00	Petersson 46'; Johansson 90'	Report	Larsson Jigliden 40'; C. Gustavsson 43'; Melander 51'	Stadium: Tingbergsvallen; Attendance: 76; Referee: Marcus Lundgren (Gothenburg)

17 June 2014	Wollmars FF (8)	1–4	IK Frej (3)	Täby
18:30	Lööf 13'	Report	Wiström 21'; Plavšić 50'; Cirak 66', 70'	Stadium: Vikingavallen; Attendance: 121; Referee: Christoffer Aidesjö (Stockholm)

18 June 2014	IK Gauthiod (4)	4–4 (a.e.t.) (3–4 p)	Norrby IF (3)	Grästorp
19:00	Gashi 78' (pen.), 80'; Lundgren 89', 117'	Report	Yarsuvat 51'; Kurbegović 64', 96'; Krasnici 87'	Stadium: Lunnevi IP; Attendance: 191; Referee: Victor Jensen (Trollhättan)
	Penalties
	Gashi (penalty scored); Olesen (penalty missed); Wersén (penalty scored); Lundgren (penalty scored); Andersson (penalty missed)		(penalty missed) Kurbegović; (penalty scored) Axengren; (penalty scored) Broman; (penalty scored) Ekvall; (penalty scored) Pettersson

18 July 2014	Carlstad United (4)	3–1 (a.e.t.)	IFK Åmål (4)	Karlstad
18:00	G. Haidar 91'; S. Carlsson 99'; Jingfors 108'	Report	Weingartshofer 112'	Stadium: Klasmossen IP; Attendance: 260; Referee: Fredrik Jansson (Karlstad)

18 July 2014	Östavalls IF (6)	1–6	Hudiksvalls FF (4)	Östavall
19:30	Johansson 75'	Report	Lööf 13', 17', 56', 84'; Roos 28'; Olsson 74'	Stadium: Skogsvallens IP; Attendance: 203; Referee: Jan Boström (Timrå)

19 July 2014	Ytterhogdals IK (6)	0–1	Sollefteå GIF (5)	Ytterhogdal
15:00		Report	Isaksson 79'	Stadium: Svedjevallen; Attendance: 75; Referee: Joakim Nilsson (Östersund)

20 July 2014	Eskilsminne IF (4)	7–1	FC Höllviken (4)	Helsingborg
18:00	Åberg 1', 35', 65'; Ander 4'; Book 27'; Egger 74'	Report	Henriksson 89'	Stadium: Harlyckans IP; Attendance: 89; Referee: Nabil Fakhro (Södra Sandby)

28 July 2014	Gnosjö IF (6)	1–3	Assyriska Turabdin IK (5)	Gnosjö
19:00	J. Björnell 15'	Report	Kamhié 20'; Pourjanekikhani 54'; Hökson 85'	Stadium: Töllshov IP; Attendance: 57; Referee: Andreas Hedström (Eksjö)

29 July 2014	Asarums IF (4)	0–2	Kristianstads FF (3)	Karlshamn
18:30		Report	Aganović 50'; Sekiraca 81'	Stadium: Asarums IP; Attendance: 375; Referee: Jakob Magnetorp (Lund)

30 July 2014	Nora-Pershyttan BK (6)	1–4	Karlstad BK (4)	Nora
19:00	Steiner 34'	Report	Richards 24', 48'; Istrefi 72', 87'	Stadium: Norvalla IP; Attendance: 393; Referee: Johan Owén (Karlskoga)

30 July 2014	Upsala IF (5)	2–2 (a.e.t.) (3–4 p)	Valsta Syrianska IK (3)	Uppsala
19:00	Folkesson 16'; Nema 116'	Report	Soğuk 69'; Eriksson 96'	Stadium: Österängens IP; Attendance: 91; Referee: Johan Thalin (Storvreta)
	Penalties
	Folkesson (penalty missed); Kvarneå (penalty missed); Lindborg (penalty missed); Caurell (penalty scored); Pettersson (penalty scored); Stenmark (penalty scored); Nelin (penalty missed)		(penalty missed) Aslan; (penalty scored) Mattiasson; (penalty missed) Gómez; (penalty missed) Ike; (penalty scored) Soğuk; (penalty scored) Asfar; (penalty scored) Hansen

31 July 2014	Nässjö FF (5)	2–3	Oskarshamns AIK (3)	Nässjö
19:00	Jonasson 53'; Danneman 90'	Report	Dembo Coly 8'; E. Dolk 36'; Lengyel 51'	Stadium: Skogsvallen; Attendance: 168; Referee: Mirza Kažić (Växjö)

1 August 2014	Eneby BK (6)	0–7	Motala AIF (3)	Norrköping
19:00		Report	Alushaj 38', 80', 88'; Magnusson Glaad 55'; Miller 67'; Silka 74', 77'	Stadium: Fyrby IP; Attendance: 87; Referee: Henrik Persson (Finspång)

2 August 2014	Dalhem IF (6)	0–3	Nyköpings BIS (3)	Visby
14:00		Report	Gage 10'; Ahmetović 25'; Raad Ishak 84'	Stadium: Dalhem IP; Attendance: 213; Referee: Suhel Youssef (Sollentuna)

2 August 2014	Ockelbo IF (6)	0–12	Dalkurd FF (3)	Ockelbo
14:00		Report	Serhanoğlu 13', 32'; Jagne 22', 64'; Persson 28', 51'; Lindmark 42'; Awad 68'; Azizi 80', 90'; Omoh 86'; Suljević 90'	Stadium: Ockelbo IP; Attendance: 297; Referee: Mattias Falk (Valbo)

4 August 2014	Kvibille BK (6)	0–1	IS Halmia (3)	Kvibille
18:30		Report	Gulda 90+1'	Stadium: Björkevi IP; Attendance: 198; Referee: Marko Mladenović (Gothenburg)

5 August 2014	Strömsbergs IF (4)	2–4	Vasalunds IF (3)	Tierp
18:30	Ali 46', 59'	Report	Johansson 5', 57'; Nekrouf 16', 76'	Stadium: Strömbergs IP; Attendance: 100; Referee: Metin Yıldırım (Södertälje)

5 August 2014	Lindome GIF (4)	1–2	Örgryte IS (3)	Lindome
19:00	Veljović 90'	Report	Ingvarsson 35'; Sandberg 72'	Stadium: Lindevi IP; Attendance: 1,047; Referee: Adnan Jukić (Falkenberg)

5 August 2014	IF Lödde (5)	4–1	Höganäs BK (4)	Kävlinge
19:00	Liljekvist 59'; G. Edén 63'; Runnberg 67'; Fatih 84'	Report	Andersson 3'	Stadium: Tolvans IP; Attendance: 250; Referee: Henrik Reffers (Arkelstorp)

5 August 2014	IFK Malmö (5)	1–4	Torns IF (4)	Malmö
19:00	Nilsson 44'	Report	Olofsson 3'; Podsiadly 35'; Kosik Sulaiman 50', 54'	Stadium: Malmö Stadion; Attendance: 150; Referee: Nehat Maxhuni (Lyckeby)

5 August 2014	Kinna IF (5)	1–6	Torslanda IK (4)	Kinna
19:00	Bjelkenberg 78'	Report	Johansson 7'; Thordson 36'; E. Olsson 46'; Jusuf 51', 73', 89'	Stadium: Viskavallen; Attendance: 90; Referee: Haris Memišević (Gothenburg)

5 August 2014	IFK Kumla (5)	0–1	Skövde AIK (3)	Kumla
19:00		Report	Johansson 53'	Stadium: Kumla IP; Attendance: 125; Referee: Namik Idrizović (Örebro)

5 August 2013	Sandviks IK (4)	2–3 (a.e.t.)	IFK Luleå (3)	Holmsund
19:00	Olofsson 45'; Brännström 69'	Report	D. Andersson 26'; García 90'; Vladimir Lazarev 102'	Stadium: Sandviks IP; Attendance: 362; Referee: Pär Nilsson (Umeå)

5 August 2013	Skoftebyns IF (5)	0–3	FC Trollhättan (3)	Trollhättan
19:00		Report	Daoud 69'; Rundström 75'; Lundqvist 90'	Stadium: Nysätra IP; Attendance: 650; Referee: Mikael Eriksson (Jönköping)

5 August 2014	Konyaspor KIF (4)	0–6	Huddinge IF (3)	Norsborg
19:00		Report	Åkerlund 10'; Ünver 56'; Touma 67'; Johansson Matikka 70'; Almström Tähti 73'; Enström 78'	Stadium: Alby BP; Attendance: 250; Referee: Mikael Devletyan Gudmundsson (Stockholm)

6 August 2014	Akropolis IF (4)	1–2	Västerås SK (3)	Stockholm
18:30	Rashidi 90'	Report	Joakim Häll 58'; Salimi 74'	Stadium: Akalla BP; Attendance: 133; Referee: Jonas Bäcklund (Solna)

6 August 2014	BW 90 IF (4)	3–1	BK Olympic (5)	Bjärsjölagård
19:00	Rexhepi 70'; Legiec 77'; Bovar Karim 88'	Report	Seljmani 8'	Stadium: Bjärsjölagårds IP; Attendance: 70; Referee: Magnus Blennersjö (Lund)

6 August 2014	Grebbestads IF (4)	0–1	Utsiktens BK (3)	Grebbestad
19:00		Report	Mijaljević 8'	Stadium: Siljevi IP; Attendance: 315; Referee: Fredrick Oppong (Gothenburg)

6 August 2014	Eskilstuna City (4)	2–1 (a.e.t.)	IF Sylvia (3)	Eskilstuna
19:00	Pektas 90', 117'	Report	Binns 77'	Stadium: Tunavallen; Attendance: 196; Referee: Pontus Orebrand (Östhammar)

6 August 2014	Myresjö/Vetlanda FK (5)	2–1	Nybro IF (5)	Myresjö
19:00	Kakembo 69'; Karlsson 80'	Report	Gómez 42'	Stadium: Myrvalla; Attendance: 180; Referee: Gheorghe Piscoran (Tenhult)

6 August 2014	Enskede IK (4)	0–1	AFC United (3)	Stockholm
19:00		Report	Rogić 32'	Stadium: Enskede IP; Attendance: 162; Referee: Farouk Nehdi (Huddinge)

6 August 2014	Värmdö IF (4)	1–1 (a.e.t.) (3–2 p)	Nacka FF (4)	Värmdö
19:00	Thompson 21'	Report	Marrah 90+4' (pen.)	Stadium: Värmdövallen; Attendance: 320; Referee: Fredrik Hansson (Stockholm)
	Penalties
	R. Abdulla (penalty scored); Sonko (penalty missed); Gustafsson (penalty scored); Thompson (penalty missed); Monteiro (penalty scored)		(penalty scored) Marrah; (penalty scored) Rashidi; (penalty missed) León Valderrama; (penalty missed) Ryckert; (penalty missed) F. Forsberg

== Round 2 ==
All teams from 2014 Allsvenskan and 2014 Superettan entered this round, 32 teams in total, where they were joined by the 32 winners from round 1. The 32 teams from Allsvenskan and Superettan were seeded and played against the 32 winners from round 1, the matches was played at the home venues for the unseeded teams. The 16 northernmost seeded teams were drawn against the 16 northernmost unseeded teams and the same with the southernmost teams.

The draw was made on 7 August 2014. The round was primarily played on 20–21 August 2014, but teams competing in European competition had their matches postponed. The number in brackets indicates what tier of Swedish football each team competed in during the 2014 season. Assyriska Turabdin IK, IF Lödde, Myresjö/Vetlanda FK and Sollefteå GIF were the lowest-ranked teams in this round, competing in Division 3, the fifth tier of Swedish football.

20 August 2014	Hudiksvalls FF (4)	2–0	Husqvarna FF (2)	Hudiksvall
17:45	Hafizović 34'; Lööf 56'	Report		Stadium: Glysisvallen; Attendance: 546; Referee: Mohamed Nablsi (Gävle)

20 August 2014	Nyköpings BIS (3)	1–3	Syrianska FC (2)	Nyköping
18:00	Gage 82'	Report	Bisse 61'; Georges 72' (pen.); Ghoddos 74'	Stadium: Rosvalla IP; Attendance: 242; Referee: Farouk Nehdi (Huddinge)

20 August 2014	BW 90 IF (4)	0–5	Östers IF (2)	Bjärsjölagård
18:00		Report	Wihlborg 11'; Bergholtz 30', 73'; Gero 55'; Velić 65' (pen.)	Stadium: Bjärsjölagårds IP; Attendance: 190; Referee: Fredrik Klitte (Helsingborg)

20 August 2014	Kristianstads FF (3)	2–1	Kalmar FF (1)	Kristianstad
18:15	Nilsson 3'; Nicklasson 79'	Report	Öhman 8'	Stadium: Kristianstads IP; Attendance: 648; Referee: Kaspar Sjöberg (Malmö)

20 August 2014	IF Lödde (5)	0–1	Ljungskile SK (2)	Tolvans IP, Kävlinge
18:30		Report	Björlund 70'	Attendance: 420; Referee: Robert Daradić (Helsingborg)

20 August 2014	Sävedalens IF (4)	2–5	Ängelholms FF (2)	Partille
18:30	Johansson 9'; Tengfjord 90'	Report	Baggner 59'; Asaad 78', 85'; Mirosavić 82'; El Kabir 87'	Stadium: Vallhamra IP; Attendance: 250; Referee: Haris Memišević (Gothenburg)

20 August 2014	Huddinge IF (3)	2–2 (a.e.t.) (5–4 p)	Åtvidabergs FF (1)	Huddinge
19:00	Touma 11'; Liljestrand 90'	Report	Bergström 27', 45'	Stadium: Källbrinks IP; Attendance: 475; Referee: Patrik Eriksson (Gävle)
	Penalties
	Poli (penalty scored); Stocklassa (penalty scored); Touma (penalty scored); Matwiejew (penalty scored); Liljestrand (penalty scored)		(penalty scored) Pettersson; (penalty scored) Hallingström; (penalty missed) Christensen; (penalty scored) Abubakari; (penalty scored) Sköld

20 August 2014	IK Frej (3)	1–5	IF Brommapojkarna (1)	Täby
19:00	Johnson 20'	Report	Rexhepi 25'; Albornoz 37', 68', 77'; Sandberg Magnusson 47'	Stadium: Vikingavallen; Attendance: 969; Referee: Per Melin (Gävle)

20 August 2014	Dalkurd FF (3)	4–1	GIF Sundsvall (2)	Borlänge
19:00	Omoh 21', 30'; Omeje 56'; Awad 90+1'	Report	Dibba 14'	Stadium: Domnarvsvallen; Attendance: 250; Referee: Victor Wolf (Tranås)

20 August 2014	Västerås SK (3)	3–1	Östersunds FK (2)	Västerås
19:00	Buya 3', 16'; Hermann 41'	Report	Morgan 55'	Stadium: Swedbank Park; Attendance: 1,187; Referee: Diako Behnam (Stockholm)

20 August 2014	Vasalunds IF (3)	2–5	IK Sirius (2)	Solna
19:00	Johansson 47'; Figueroa 83' (pen.)	Report	Ogbu 30', 57'; Saleh 54'; Ahonen 88'; Skoglund 90+2' (pen.)	Stadium: Skytteholms IP; Attendance: 150; Referee: Jesper Ekwall (Haninge)

20 August 2014	IFK Luleå (3)	0–2	AIK (1)	Luleå
19:00		Report	Goitom 74'; Nikolić 84'	Stadium: Skogsvallen; Attendance: 2,816; Referee: Lars Olsson (Umeå)

20 August 2014	Valsta Syrianska IK (3)	2–3	Gefle IF (1)	Märsta
19:00	Soğuk 4'; Eriksson 69'	Report	Lantto 47'; Bertilsson 66', 73'	Stadium: Midgårdsvallen; Attendance: 94; Referee: Dragan Banjac (Haninge)

20 August 2014	FC Trollhättan (3)	2–1 (a.e.t.)	Falkenbergs FF (1)	Trollhättan
19:00	Mollapolci 11'; Lext 92'	Report	Nilsson 21'	Stadium: Edsborgs IP; Attendance: 710; Referee: Magnus Lindgren (Gothenburg)

20 August 2014	Assyriska Turabdin IK (5)	0–5	IFK Göteborg (1)	Jönköping
19:00		Report	J. Johansson 17'; Allansson 39'; Zohore 53'; Calvo 59', 89'	Stadium: Stadsparksvallen; Attendance: 1,300; Referee: Mikael Eriksson (Jönköping)

20 August 2014	Skövde AIK (3)	4–5	Varbergs BoIS (2)	Skövde
19:00	Vandinho 18' (pen.), 75'; S. Abraham 20'; Hamidović 31'	Report	Tillman 12'; Keymer 52' (o.g.); Rexhepi 87', 90+1'; Mellqvist 89'	Stadium: Södermalms IP; Attendance: 249; Referee: Namik Idrizović (Örebro)

20 August 2014	Eskilstuna City (4)	0–2	Örebro SK (1)	Eskilstuna
19:30		Report	Holmberg 15'; Gustavsson 90+2'	Stadium: Tunavallen; Attendance: 1,212; Referee: Johan Krantz (Uppsala)

21 August 2014	Myresjö/Vetlanda FK (5)	2–1 (a.e.t.)	IFK Värnamo (2)	Myresjö
18:00	Lager 71'; Kakembo 117'	Report	Fadi 90+1'	Stadium: Myrvalla; Attendance: 502; Referee: Andreas Johansson (Jönköping)

21 August 2014	Sollefteå GIF (5)	0–1	Assyriska FF (2)	Sollefteå
18:30		Report	Makdessi 78'	Stadium: Nipvallen; Attendance: 950; Referee: Niklas Abrahamsson (Sollefteå)

21 August 2014	Torns IF (4)	1–1 (a.e.t.) (7–8 p)	Landskrona BoIS (2)	Lund
18:30	Darban-Khales 48'	Report	E. Andersson 50'	Stadium: Tornvallen; Attendance: 750; Referee: Nabil Fakhro (Södra Sandby)
	Penalties
	Thulin (penalty missed); Abo-Sharkh (penalty scored); Kosik Sulaiman (penalty scored); Darban-Khales (penalty scored); Olofsson (penalty scored); Milutinović (penalty scored); Edsheim (penalty scored); N. Nilsson (penalty scored); Landén (penalty missed)		(penalty scored) Stadler; (penalty scored) Ahmetović; (penalty scored) Nordbeck; (penalty scored) Adelstam; (penalty missed) E. Andersson; (penalty scored) P. Andersson; (penalty scored) Lydén; (penalty scored) Jarl; (penalty scored) Olofsson

21 August 2014	AFC United (3)	2–1 (a.e.t.)	Degerfors IF (2)	Solna
19:00	Rogić 49'; Carlsson 101'	Report	Hedsén 41'	Stadium: Skytteholms IP; Attendance: 280; Referee: Adam Ladebäck (Visby)

21 August 2014	Värmdö IF (4)	0–2	Jönköpings Södra IF (2)	Värmdö
19:00		Report	Dimitrijević 63'; Watson 78'	Stadium: Värmdövallen; Attendance: 425; Referee: Björn Särnbrink (Huddinge)

21 August 2014	Oskarshamns AIK (3)	0–4	BK Häcken (1)	Oskarshamn
19:00		Report	Ohlsson 69'; Þorvaldsson 79'; Makondele 86'; Jeremejeff 89'	Stadium: Arena Oskarshamn; Attendance: 803; Referee: Nermin Čisić (Värnamo)

21 August 2014	Örgryte IS (3)	1–2 (a.e.t.)	Halmstads BK (1)	Gothenburg
19:00	Strinäs 80'	Report	Antonsson 64', 96'	Stadium: Valhalla IP; Attendance: 873; Referee: Alexander Pavlović (Gothenburg)

26 August 2014	Torslanda IK (4)	1–4	Helsingborgs IF (1)	Gothenburg
17:45	Jusuf 72'	Report	J. Larsson 14', 48'; Smárason 38'; Boateng 59'	Stadium: Torslandavallen; Attendance: 750; Referee: Antti Kanerva (Olofstorp)

3 September 2014	Motala AIF (3)	0–4	Djurgårdens IF (1)	Motala
17:30		Report	Jawo 59'; Faltsetas 68'; Andersson 75'; Hellquist 90'	Stadium: Motala Idrottspark; Attendance: 2,068; Referee: Jim Petersson (Motala)

4 September 2014	Norrby IF (3)	3–2 (a.e.t.)	GAIS (2)	Borås
19:00	Kurbegović 29', 95'; Yarsuvat 52'	Report	Kocak 12'; K. Gustafsson 43'	Stadium: Borås Arena; Attendance: 962; Referee: Adnan Jukić (Falkenberg)

7 September 2014	Utsiktens BK (3)	0–2	Mjällby AIF (1)	Gothenburg
17:00		Report	V. Nilsson 43', 85'	Stadium: Ruddalens IP; Attendance: 303; Referee: Antti Kanerva (Olofstorp)

11 September 2014	Carlstad United (4)	1–3	IFK Norrköping (1)	Karlstad
18:30	Jingfors 10'	Report	Traustason 48'; Lawan 78'; Nyman 89'	Stadium: Tingvalla IP; Attendance: 753; Referee: Nermin Čisić (Värnamo)

17 September 2014	Karlstad BK (4)	1–2	Hammarby IF (2)	Karlstad
18:00	F. Nilsson 90'	Report	Besara 16'; Theorin 68'	Stadium: Tingvalla IP; Attendance: 500; Referee: Jim Petersson (Motala)

22 October 2014	Eskilsminne IF (4)	1–6	IF Elfsborg (1)	Helsingborg
19:00	Ander 56'	Report	Claesson 5'; Petersson 11' (o.g.); Beckmann 35' (pen.); Nilsson 36', 60'; Zeneli 49'	Stadium: Harlyckans IP; Attendance: 1,532; Referee: Fredrik Klitte (Helsingborg)

15 November 2014	IS Halmia (3)	1–2 (a.e.t.)	Malmö FF (1)	Halmstad
14:00	Taube 49'	Report	Adu 75'; Rosenberg 102' (pen.)	Stadium: Örjans Vall; Attendance: 1,618; Referee: Jonas Karlsson (Målilla)

== Group stage ==
The 32 winners from round 2 were divided into eight groups of four teams. The 16 highest ranked winners from the previous rounds were seeded to the top two positions in each groups and the 16 remaining winners were unseeded in the draw. The ranking of the 16 seeded teams was decided by league position in the 2014 season. All teams in the group played each other once, the highest ranked teams from the previous rounds and teams from tier three or lower had the right to play two home matches. The draw for the group stage was held on 19 November 2014. The group stage began on 21 February and concluded on 8 March 2015. Myresjö/Vetlanda FK was the lowest-ranked team in this round, competing in Division 3, the fifth tier of Swedish football.

All times listed below are in Central European Time (UTC+1). (Note: This is the time zone of Sweden during the winter when group stage is played.)

=== Tie-breaking criteria and key ===
If two or more teams were equal on points on completion of the group matches, the following criteria were applied to determine the rankings

1. superior goal difference
2. higher number of goals scored
3. result between the teams in question
4. higher league position in the 2014 season

=== Group 1 ===
Pos	Team	Pld	W	D	L	GF	GA	GD	Pts	Qualification	MFF	JSIF	AFF	HFF
1	Malmö FF	3	3	0	0	12	0	+12	9	Advance to Knockout stage	—	4–0	3–0	—
2	Jönköpings Södra IF	3	2	0	1	6	5	+1	6		—	—	2–0	—
3	Assyriska FF	3	1	0	2	3	6	−3	3		—	—	—	3–1
4	Hudiksvalls FF	3	0	0	3	2	12	−10	0		0–5	1–4	—	—

Source: svenskfotboll.se (in Swedish)
Rules for classification: 1) Points; 2) Goal difference; 3) Number of goals scored; 4) Head-to-head record; 5) Highest ranked team

21 February 2015 Matchday 1	Hudiksvalls FF (4)	1–4	Jönköpings Södra IF (2)	Hudiksvall
13:00	Karlsson 52' (pen.)	Report	Smylie 12', 29'; Silka 44'; Olsson 75'	Stadium: Glysisvallen; Attendance: 270; Referee: Patrik Eriksson (Gävle)

22 February 2015 Matchday 1	Malmö FF (1)	3–0	Assyriska FF (2)	Malmö
16:00	Helander 5'; Sana 45'; Eikrem 89'	Report		Stadium: Malmö IP; Attendance: 5,560; Referee: Andreas Ekberg (Lund)

28 February 2015 Matchday 2	Hudiksvalls FF (4)	0–5	Malmö FF (1)	Hudiksvall
14:00		Report	Eikrem 25'; Tinnerholm 30'; Rosenberg 69'; Berget 70'; Wallin 72' (o.g.)	Stadium: Glysisvallen; Attendance: 982; Referee: Glenn Nyberg (Borlänge)

28 February 2015 Matchday 2	Jönköpings Södra IF (2)	2–0	Assyriska FF (2)	Jönköping
16:00	Smylie 39'; Sabo 73'	Report		Stadium: Elmiahallen; Attendance: 372; Referee: Nermin Čisić (Värnamo)

7 March 2015 Matchday 3	Assyriska FF (2)	3–1	Hudiksvalls FF (4)	Södertälje
16:00	Genc 53'; Nilsson 83'; Brandeborn 85'	Report	Sener 57'	Stadium: Södertälje Fotbollsarena; Attendance: 299; Referee: Dragan Banjac (Haninge)

7 March 2015 Matchday 3	Malmö FF (1)	4–0	Jönköpings Södra IF (2)	Malmö
16:00	Berget 3'; Eikrem 23'; Rosenberg 56'; Mehmeti 81'	Report		Stadium: Malmö IP; Attendance: 3,646; Referee: Mohammed Al-Hakim (Köping)

=== Group 2 ===
Pos	Team	Pld	W	D	L	GF	GA	GD	Pts	Qualification	IFKG	FCT	LSK	MYR
1	IFK Göteborg	3	2	1	0	13	2	+11	7	Advance to Knockout stage	—	—	5–0	—
2	FC Trollhättan	3	1	2	0	5	4	+1	5		2–2	—	—	2–1
3	Ljungskile SK	3	1	1	1	6	6	0	4		—	1–1	—	—
4	Myresjö/Vetlanda FK	3	0	0	3	1	13	−12	0		0–6	—	0–5	—

Source: svenskfotboll.se (in Swedish)
Rules for classification: 1) Points; 2) Goal difference; 3) Number of goals scored; 4) Head-to-head record; 5) Highest ranked team

21 February 2015 Matchday 1	FC Trollhättan (4)	2–2	IFK Göteborg (1)	Trollhättan
15:00	Bennhage 68'; Gustafsson 78'	Report	Rieks 36'; Boman 57'	Stadium: Edsborgs IP; Attendance: 2,417; Referee: Michael Lerjéus (Skövde)

22 February 2015 Matchday 1	Myresjö/Vetlanda FK (5)	0–5	Ljungskile SK (2)	Vetlanda
14:00		Report	Sema 17', 36', 81'; Mellqvist 24'; Bajrović 64'	Stadium: Heds Arena; Attendance: 311; Referee: Nermin Čisić (Värnamo)

28 February 2015 Matchday 2	Ljungskile SK (2)	1–1	FC Trollhättan (4)	Uddevalla
14:00	Björlund 52'	Report	Daoud 85'	Stadium: Rimnersvallen; Attendance: 315; Referee: Kristoffer Karlsson (Höganäs)

28 February 2015 Matchday 2	Myresjö/Vetlanda FK (5)	0–6	IFK Göteborg (1)	Vetlanda
16:00		Report	Smedberg-Dalence 5' (pen.); Vibe 32', 41', 52'; Boman 40'; Bjärsmyr 65'	Stadium: Heds Arena; Attendance: 1,856; Referee: Kaspar Sjöberg (Malmö)

8 March 2015 Matchday 3	FC Trollhättan (4)	2–1	Myresjö/Vetlanda FK (5)	Trollhättan
14:00	Bagger 52'; Larsson 80'	Report	Elmersson 67'	Stadium: Edsborgs IP; Attendance: 235; Referee: Antti Kanerva (Olofstorp)

8 March 2015 Matchday 3	IFK Göteborg (1)	5–0	Ljungskile SK (2)	Gothenburg
14:00	Eriksson 37'; Pettersson 56'; Vibe 61', 62'; Salomonsson 75'	Report		Stadium: Valhalla IP; Attendance: 3,423; Referee: Kristoffer Karlsson (Höganäs)

=== Group 3 ===
Pos	Team	Pld	W	D	L	GF	GA	GD	Pts	Qualification	HAM	AIK	LAN	KFF
1	Hammarby IF	3	2	1	0	4	2	+2	7	Advance to Knockout stage	—	—	1–1	—
2	AIK	3	2	0	1	8	2	+6	6		1–2	—	4–0	—
3	Landskrona BoIS	3	1	1	1	3	6	−3	4		—	—	—	2–1
4	Kristianstads FF	3	0	0	3	1	6	−5	0		0–1	0–3	—	—

Source: svenskfotboll.se (in Swedish)
Rules for classification: 1) Points; 2) Goal difference; 3) Number of goals scored; 4) Head-to-head record; 5) Highest ranked team

21 February 2015 Matchday 1	AIK (1)	4–0	Landskrona BoIS (3)	Stockholm
13:00	Johansson 39'; Sonko Sundberg 45'; Goitom 59'; Bangura 73'	Report		Stadium: Grimsta IP; Attendance: 3,015; Referee: Stefan Johannesson (Täby)

21 February 2015 Matchday 1	Kristianstads FF (3)	0–1	Hammarby IF (1)	Kristianstad
14:00		Report	Hallenius 25'	Stadium: Kristianstads IP; Attendance: 1,860; Referee: Kristoffer Karlsson (Höganäs)

28 February 2015 Matchday 2	Kristianstads FF (3)	0–3	AIK (1)	Kristianstad
14:00		Report	Väisänen 28'; Lundholm 50'; Bahoui 59' (pen.)	Stadium: Kristianstads IP; Attendance: 1,982; Referee: Andreas Ekberg (Lund)

1 March 2015 Matchday 2	Hammarby IF (1)	1–1	Landskrona BoIS (3)	Stockholm
16:00	Rennie 67'	Report	Jarl 3'	Stadium: Tele2 Arena; Attendance: 10,419; Referee: Mohammed Al-Hakim (Köping)

7 March 2015 Matchday 3	Landskrona BoIS (3)	2–1	Kristianstads FF (3)	Landskrona
13:00	Stadler 48', 73'	Report	Ejupi 67'	Stadium: Landskrona IP; Attendance: 350; Referee: Kaspar Sjöberg (Malmö)

7 March 2015 Matchday 3	AIK (1)	1–2	Hammarby IF (1)	Solna
13:00	Goitom 8'	Report	Bakircioglü 14' (pen.); Persson 62'	Stadium: Friends Arena; Attendance: 41,063; Referee: Michael Lerjéus (Skövde)

=== Group 4 ===
Pos	Team	Pld	W	D	L	GF	GA	GD	Pts	Qualification	IFE	IKS	AFC	BP
1	IF Elfsborg	3	3	0	0	10	1	+9	9	Advance to Knockout stage	—	4–0	—	1–0
2	IK Sirius	3	2	0	1	6	6	0	6		—	—	3–1	—
3	AFC United	3	1	0	2	3	8	−5	3		1–5	—	—	1–0
4	IF Brommapojkarna	3	0	0	3	1	5	−4	0		—	1–3	—	—

Source: svenskfotboll.se (in Swedish)
Rules for classification: 1) Points; 2) Goal difference; 3) Number of goals scored; 4) Head-to-head record; 5) Highest ranked team

21 February 2015 Matchday 1	IF Elfsborg (1)	4–0	IK Sirius (2)	Borås
16:00	Hedlund 4', 80'; Zeneli 82'; Frick 86'	Report		Stadium: Borås Arena; Attendance: 772; Referee: Johan Hamlin (Bro)

22 February 2015 Matchday 1	AFC United (2)	1–0	IF Brommapojkarna (2)	Solna
14:00	Jawo 90'	Report		Stadium: Skytteholms IP; Attendance: 200; Referee: Markus Strömbergsson (Gävle)

28 February 2015 Matchday 2	IF Brommapojkarna (2)	1–3	IK Sirius (2)	Stockholm
14:00	Sandberg Magnusson 8'	Report	Silva 21'; Ogbu 83'; Ahonen 90+3'	Stadium: Grimsta IP; Attendance: 241; Referee: Patrik Eriksson (Gävle)

1 March 2015 Matchday 2	AFC United (2)	1–5	IF Elfsborg (1)	Solna
16:00	Carlsson 48'	Report	Claesson 11' (pen.), 66'; Hedlund 57'; Frick 64'; Zeneli 90'	Stadium: Skytteholms IP; Attendance: 287; Referee: Johan Hamlin (Bro)

8 March 2015 Matchday 3	IK Sirius (2)	3–1	AFC United (2)	Uppsala
16:00	J. Andersson 12'; Thor 29'; Skoglund 80'	Report	El Kabir 10'	Stadium: Lötens IP; Attendance: 242; Referee: Martin Strömbergsson (Gävle)

8 March 2015 Matchday 3	IF Elfsborg (1)	1–0	IF Brommapojkarna (2)	Borås
16:00	Claesson 45'	Report		Stadium: Borås Arena; Attendance: 1,058; Referee: Per Melin (Gävle)

=== Group 5 ===
Pos	Team	Pld	W	D	L	GF	GA	GD	Pts	Qualification	BKH	MAIF	ÖIF	HUD
1	BK Häcken	3	3	0	0	9	3	+6	9	Advance to Knockout stage	—	4–2	2–0	—
2	Mjällby AIF	3	2	0	1	8	4	+4	6		—	—	2–0	—
3	Östers IF	3	1	0	2	3	4	−1	3		—	—	—	3–0
4	Huddinge IF	3	0	0	3	1	10	−9	0		1–3	0–4	—	—

Source: svenskfotboll.se (in Swedish)
Rules for classification: 1) Points; 2) Goal difference; 3) Number of goals scored; 4) Head-to-head record; 5) Highest ranked team

21 February 2015 Matchday 1	Huddinge IF (3)	0–4	Mjällby AIF (2)	Solna
16:00		Report	Håkansson 43'; S. Nilsson 62'; Bonsu 66'; Ekenberg 88' (pen.)	Stadium: Skytteholms IP; Attendance: 350; Referee: Glenn Nyberg (Borlänge)

25 February 2015 Matchday 1	BK Häcken (1)	2–0	Östers IF (3)	Gothenburg
19:00	Mohammed 73'; Simon Gustafson 88'	Report		Stadium: Valhalla IP; Attendance: 419; Referee: Jim Petersson (Motala)

28 February 2015 Matchday 2	Huddinge IF (3)	1–3	BK Häcken (1)	Solna
17:00	Amoah 58'	Report	Rexhepi 1'; J. Andersson 53'; Samuel Gustafson 90+3'	Stadium: Skytteholms IP; Attendance: 102; Referee: Johan Krantz (Uppsala)

1 March 2015 Matchday 2	Mjällby AIF (2)	2–0	Östers IF (3)	Hällevik
14:00	S. Nilsson 18'; D. Nilsson 58'	Report		Stadium: Strandvallen; Attendance: 314; Referee: Dragan Banjac (Haninge)

7 March 2015 Matchday 3	Östers IF (3)	3–0	Huddinge IF (3)	Växjö
14:00	Söderberg 29' (pen.); Velić 89'; Wihlborg 90'	Report		Stadium: Tipshallen; Attendance: 841; Referee: Jim Petersson (Motala)

7 March 2015 Matchday 3	BK Häcken (1)	4–2	Mjällby AIF (2)	Gothenburg
14:00	Abubakari 8'; Simon Gustafson 22', 90'; Þorvaldsson 87'	Report	Ervik 36'; Abdu 88'	Stadium: Valhalla IP; Attendance: 673; Referee: Nermin Čisić (Värnamo)

=== Group 6 ===
Pos	Team	Pld	W	D	L	GF	GA	GD	Pts	Qualification	ÖSK	GIF	VAR	DFF
1	Örebro SK	3	2	1	0	6	4	+2	7	Advance to Knockout stage	—	2–1	3–3	—
2	Gefle IF	3	2	0	1	5	4	+1	6		—	—	2–1	—
3	Varbergs BoIS	3	1	1	1	6	5	+1	4		—	—	—	2–0
4	Dalkurd FF	3	0	0	3	1	5	−4	0		0–1	1–2	—	—

Source: svenskfotboll.se (in Swedish)
Rules for classification: 1) Points; 2) Goal difference; 3) Number of goals scored; 4) Head-to-head record; 5) Highest ranked team

21 February 2015 Matchday 1	Örebro SK (1)	3–3	Varbergs BoIS (2)	Örebro
14:00	Kamara 16', 61'; Nordmark 63'	Report	Nyström 37'; Peter 47'; Kujović 67'	Stadium: Behrn Arena; Attendance: 1,311; Referee: Mohammed Al-Hakim (Köping)

22 February 2015 Matchday 1	Dalkurd FF (3)	1–2	Gefle IF (1)	Borlänge
14:00	Jagne 80'	Report	Oremo 30'; 44' (o.g.)	Stadium: Domnarsvallen; Attendance: 256; Referee: Robert Daradić (Helsingborg)

1 March 2015 Matchday 2	Dalkurd FF (3)	0–1	Örebro SK (1)	Borlänge
14:00		Report	Pode 41'	Stadium: Domnarsvallen; Attendance: 822; Referee: Martin Strömbergsson (Gävle)

1 March 2015 Matchday 2	Gefle IF (1)	2–1	Varbergs BoIS (2)	Gävle
14:00	Bertilsson 50'; Tshakasua 90'	Report	Peter 68'	Stadium: Strömvallen; Attendance: 231; Referee: Jim Petersson (Motala)

8 March 2015 Matchday 3	Varbergs BoIS (2)	2–0	Dalkurd FF (3)	Varberg
16:00	Lindner 49'; Tranberg 85'	Report		Stadium: Övrevi IP; Attendance: 260; Referee: Robert Daradić (Helsingborg)

8 March 2015 Matchday 3	Örebro SK (1)	2–1	Gefle IF (1)	Örebro
16:00	Gerzić 43'; Gustavsson 60'	Report	Oremo 50'	Stadium: Behrn Arena; Attendance: 1,013; Referee: Johan Hamlin (Bro)

=== Group 7 ===
Pos	Team	Pld	W	D	L	GF	GA	GD	Pts	Qualification	IFKN	NIF	DIF	ÄFF
1	IFK Norrköping	3	2	0	1	7	3	+4	6	Advance to Knockout stage	—	—	—	2–0
2	Norrby IF	3	2	0	1	9	6	+3	6		0–4	—	4–2	—
3	Djurgårdens IF	3	1	1	1	5	5	0	4		3–1	—	—	0–0
4	Ängelholms FF	3	0	1	2	0	7	−7	1		—	0–5	—	—

Source: svenskfotboll.se (in Swedish)
Rules for classification: 1) Points; 2) Goal difference; 3) Number of goals scored; 4) Head-to-head record; 5) Highest ranked team

22 February 2015 Matchday 1	Djurgårdens IF (1)	0–0	Ängelholms FF (2)	Stockholm
14:00		Report		Stadium: Tele2 Arena; Attendance: 6,517; Referee: Per Melin (Gävle)

22 February 2015 Matchday 1	Norrby IF (3)	0–4	IFK Norrköping (1)	Borås
16:00		Report	Bärkroth 24'; Kamara 45', 63'; Citaku 84'	Stadium: Borås Arena; Attendance: 403; Referee: Antti Kanerva (Olofstorp)

1 March 2015 Matchday 2	IFK Norrköping (1)	2–0	Ängelholms FF (2)	Norrköping
14:00	Kamara 3'; Bärkroth 84'	Report		Stadium: Nya Parken; Attendance: 1,417; Referee: Antti Kanerva (Olofstorp)

1 March 2015 Matchday 2	Norrby IF (3)	4–2	Djurgårdens IF (1)	Borås
16:00	Richard Yarsuvat 14', 60', 87'; Osmanagić 79'	Report	Jawo 17'; Radetinac 63'	Stadium: Borås Arena; Attendance: 505; Referee: Michael Lerjéus (Skövde)

5 March 2015 Matchday 3	Ängelholms FF (2)	0–5	Norrby IF (3)	Helsingborg
19:00		Report	Richard Yarsuvat 18', 78'; Krasnici 20', 90'; Osmanagić 30'	Stadium: Olympiafältet; Attendance: 123; Referee: Robert Daradić (Helsingborg)

5 March 2015 Matchday 3	Djurgårdens IF (1)	3–1	IFK Norrköping (1)	Stockholm
19:00	Karlström 6'; Berntsen 15'; Radetinac 27'	Report	Traustason 82'	Stadium: Tele2 Arena; Attendance: 2,381; Referee: Bojan Pandžić (Gothenburg)

=== Group 8 ===
Pos	Team	Pld	W	D	L	GF	GA	GD	Pts	Qualification	HIF	HBK	SFC	VSK
1	Helsingborgs IF	3	1	2	0	7	3	+4	5	Advance to Knockout stage	—	1–1	2–2	—
2	Halmstads BK	3	1	2	0	6	3	+3	5		—	—	3–0	—
3	Syrianska FC	3	1	1	1	5	6	−1	4		—	—	—	3–1
4	Västerås SK	3	0	1	2	3	9	−6	1		0–4	2–2	—	—

Source: svenskfotboll.se (in Swedish)
Rules for classification: 1) Points; 2) Goal difference; 3) Number of goals scored; 4) Head-to-head record; 5) Highest ranked team

21 February 2015 Matchday 1	Västerås SK (3)	2–2	Halmstads BK (1)	Västerås
16:00	Johansson 57'; Hägg 81'	Report	Barny 14' (pen.); Ljung 73'	Stadium: Swedbank Park; Attendance: 834; Referee: Dragan Banjac (Haninge)

28 February 2015 Matchday 2	Halmstads BK (1)	3–0	Syrianska FC (2)	Halmstad
16:00	Barny 46'; Karikari 52'; Silverholt 64'	Report		Stadium: Skedalahed IP; Attendance: 461; Referee: Bojan Pandžić (Gothenburg)

1 March 2015 Matchday 2	Västerås SK (3)	0–4	Helsingborgs IF (1)	Västerås
14:00		Report	Ajdarević 30'; Wede 51'; Atakora 54'; Pálsson 66'	Stadium: Swedbank Park; Attendance: 786; Referee: Markus Strömbergsson (Gävle)

4 March 2015 Matchday 1	Helsingborgs IF (1)	2–2	Syrianska FC (2)	Helsingborg
19:00	J. Larsson 6'; Atakora 69'	Report	Ghoddos 45'; Karlsson 65'	Stadium: Olympiafältet; Attendance: 600; Referee: Andreas Ekberg (Lund)

8 March 2015 Matchday 3	Syrianska FC (2)	3–1	Västerås SK (3)	Södertälje
14:00	Karlsson 14', 56'; Ghoddos 58'	Report	Fredriksson 33'	Stadium: Södertälje Fotbollsarena; Attendance: 374; Referee: Johan Krantz (Uppsala)

8 March 2015 Matchday 3	Helsingborgs IF (1)	1–1	Halmstads BK (1)	Helsingborg
14:00	Uronen 45'	Report	Karikari 78'	Stadium: Olympiafältet; Attendance: 2,033; Referee: Stefan Johannesson (Täby)

== Knockout stage ==
=== Qualified teams ===
Pos	Grp	Team	Pld	W	D	L	GF	GA	GD	Pts	Qualification
1	1	Malmö FF	3	3	0	0	12	0	+12	9	Seeded in Quarter-final draw
2	4	IF Elfsborg	3	3	0	0	10	1	+9	9	Seeded in Quarter-final draw
3	5	BK Häcken	3	3	0	0	9	3	+6	9	Seeded in Quarter-final draw
4	2	IFK Göteborg	3	2	1	0	13	2	+11	7	Seeded in Quarter-final draw
5	6	Örebro SK	3	2	1	0	6	4	+2	7	Unseeded in Quarter-final draw
6	3	Hammarby IF	3	2	1	0	4	2	+2	7	Unseeded in Quarter-final draw
7	7	IFK Norrköping	3	2	0	1	7	3	+4	6	Unseeded in Quarter-final draw
8	8	Helsingborgs IF	3	1	2	0	7	3	+4	5	Unseeded in Quarter-final draw

Source: Group results
Rules for classification: 1) Points; 2) Goal difference; 3) Number of goals scored; 4) Highest ranked team

=== Bracket ===
Quarter-finals
14 March – Gothenburg
IFK Göteborg	2
Helsingborgs IF	0
15 March – Gothenburg
BK Häcken	3
IFK Norrköping	1
14 March – Malmö
Malmö FF	0
Örebro SK	1
15 March – Borås
IF Elfsborg	3
Hammarby IF	0

Semi-finals
21 March – Gothenburg
IFK Göteborg	3
BK Häcken	1
21 March – Örebro
Örebro SK	2
IF Elfsborg	0

Final
17 May – Gothenburg
IFK Göteborg	2
Örebro SK	1

=== Quarter-finals ===
The draw for the quarter-finals and semi-finals took place on Monday 9 March 2015, and the quarter-final matches are scheduled to be played on 14 and 15 March 2015. The quarter-finals consist of the eight teams that won their respective group in the previous round and the four best group winners were seeded and drawn against the other four group winners, with the seeded teams entitled to play the match at their home venue. Only teams from the top tier, 2015 Allsvenskan, qualified for the quarter-finals and the cup winners from last season, IF Elfsborg, were drawn against Allsvenskan newcomers Hammarby IF.

14 March 2015	Malmö FF (1)	0–1	Örebro SK (1)	Malmö
13:00		Report	Valgarðsson 22'	Stadium: Malmö IP; Attendance: 4,300; Referee: Andreas Ekberg (Lund)

14 March 2015	IFK Göteborg (1)	2–0	Helsingborgs IF (1)	Gothenburg
16:00	Engvall 2'; Ankersen 80'	Report		Stadium: Gamla Ullevi; Attendance: 7,370; Referee: Johan Hamlin (Bro)

15 March 2015	IF Elfsborg (1)	3–0	Hammarby IF (1)	Borås
14:00	Hedlund 4'; Svensson 63'; Frick 72'	Report		Stadium: Borås Arena; Attendance: 4,037; Referee: Mohammed Al-Hakim (Köping)

15 March 2015	BK Häcken (1)	3–1	IFK Norrköping (1)	Gothenburg
16:00	Þorvaldsson 36', 46'; Simon Gustafson 57'	Report	Traustason 27'	Stadium: Gamla Ullevi; Attendance: 729; Referee: Kristoffer Karlsson (Höganäs)

=== Semi-finals ===
The semi-finals are scheduled to be played on 21 and 22 March 2015 and will consist of the four winners from the quarter-finals. The draw was a free draw and the first drawn team in each pairing play the match at their home venue.

21 March 2015	IFK Göteborg (1)	3–1	BK Häcken (1)	Gothenburg
16:00	Ankersen 25', 51'; Vibe 66'	Report	Rexhepi 82'	Stadium: Gamla Ullevi; Attendance: 7,458; Referee: Andreas Ekberg (Lund)

22 March 2015	Örebro SK (1)	2–0	IF Elfsborg (1)	Örebro
15:00	Gustavsson 13'; Holmberg 73'	Report		Stadium: Behrn Arena; Attendance: 1,851; Referee: Bojan Pandžić (Gothenburg)

=== Final ===
The final was played on 17 May 2015. The draw for which team to be given home advantage was held on 23 March 2015; this was the first time since the 2011 final that the match return to one of the finalist's venue.

17 May 2015
15:30

IFK Göteborg	2–1	Örebro SK
Vibe 67'; Rieks 77'	Report	Nkili 23'

Gamla Ullevi, Gothenburg
Attendance: 16,761
Referee: Martin Strömbergsson (Gävle)
