= 2014–15 Svenska Cupen qualifying rounds =

Football tournament qualification stage

The 2014–15 Svenska Cupen is the 59th season of Svenska Cupen and the third season with the current format. The winners of the competition will earn a place in the second qualifying round of the 2015–16 UEFA Europa League, unless they have already qualified for European competition, in which case the qualification spot will go to another team, determined by a number of factors.

A total of 96 clubs will enter the competition. IF Elfsborg are the defending champions, having beaten Helsingborgs IF 1–0 in last season's final.

The only two associations of the Swedish District Football Associations that had a qualifying tournament were Dalarnas FF and Örebro Läns FF, the other districts decided their teams by Distriktsmästerskap (District Championships) or by club ranking 2013.

== Qualified teams ==
Team	District	Method of qualification
Asarums IF	Blekinge FF	2013 Svenskfast Cup winner
Grebbestads IF	Bohusläns FF	2013 Distriktsmästerskapet winner
Dalkurd FF	Dalarnas FF	Qualification tournament winner
IFK Åmål	Dalslands FF	2013 Distriktsmästerskapet winner
Ockelbo IF	Gestriklands FF	2014 Distriktsmästerskapet winner
Dalhem IF	Gotlands FF	2014 Distriktsmästerskapet winner
Örgryte IS	Göteborgs FF	Highest ranked team (Note: Based on 2013 Swedish club ranking. Teams in 2014 Allsvenskan and 2014 Superettan are not included in the ranking since they were automatically qualified for Round 2.)
Lindome GIF	Göteborgs FF	2013 Södercupen winner
Sävedalens IF	Göteborgs FF	2013 Östra Cupen winner
Torslanda IK	Göteborgs FF	2013 Hisingsmästerskapen winner
Utsiktens BK	Göteborgs FF	2013 Västra Cupen winner
IS Halmia	Hallands FF	2013 Intersport Cup winner
Kungsbacka IF	Hallands FF	2013 Intersport Cup runner-up
Kvibille BK	Hallands FF	2013 Intersport Cup third place
Hudiksvalls FF	Hälsinglands FF	2014 Distriktsmästerskapet winner
Ytterhogdals IK	Jämtland-Härjedalens FF	2014 Reaxcer Cup winner
Östavalls IF	Medelpads FF	2013 Distriktsmästerskapet runner-up (Note: Received a place since winners Selånger FK refused to enter Svenska Cupen.)
IFK Luleå	Norrbottens FF	2013 Coop Norrbotten Cup winner
Eskilsminne IF	Skånes FF	2013 Distriktsmästerskapet winner
IF Lödde	Skånes FF	2013 Distriktsmästerskapet runner-up
Höganäs BK	Skånes FF	2013 Distriktsmästerskapet semi-finalist
IFK Malmö	Skånes FF	2013 Distriktsmästerskapet semi-finalist
Torns IF	Skånes FF	2013 Distriktsmästerskapet quarter-finalist
BW 90 IF	Skånes FF	2013 Distriktsmästerskapet quarter-finalist
FC Höllviken	Skånes FF	2013 Distriktsmästerskapet quarter-finalist
BK Olympic	Skånes FF	2013 Distriktsmästerskapet quarter-finalist
Kristianstads FF	Skånes FF	2013 Distriktsmästerskapet best round of 16
Oskarshamns AIK	Smålands FF	2013 Hyundai Cup runner-up
Myresjö/Vetlanda FK	Smålands FF	2013 Hyundai Cup semi-finalist
Nybro IF	Smålands FF	2013 Hyundai Cup semi-finalist
Assyriska Turabdin IK	Smålands FF	2013 Hyundai Cup best quarter-finalist
Nässjö FF	Smålands FF	2013 Hyundai Cup 2nd best quarter-finalist
Gnosjö IF	Smålands FF	2013 Hyundai Cup 3rd best quarter-finalist (Note: Received a place since winners Husqvarna FF were automatically qualified for Round 2 as a Superettan team.)
Nyköpings BIS	Södermanlands FF	2014 Distriktsmästerskapet winner
Eskilstuna City	Södermanlands FF	2014 Distriktsmästerskapet runner-up
Vasalunds IF	Stockholms FF	Highest ranked team
IK Frej	Stockholms FF	2nd highest ranked team
AFC United	Stockholms FF	3rd highest ranked team
Huddinge IF	Stockholms FF	4th highest ranked team
Enskede IK	Stockholms FF	5th highest ranked team
Konyaspor KIF	Stockholms FF	6th highest ranked team
Värmdö IF	Stockholms FF	7th highest ranked team
Akropolis IF	Stockholms FF	8th highest ranked team
Nacka FF	Stockholms FF	2012–13 Stockholm Cup winner
Wollmars FF	Stockholms FF	2012–13 Stockholm Cup semi-finalist (Note: Received a place since 2012–13 Stockholm Cup runners-up Enskede IK and the other semi-finalist Värmdö IF was two of the 8th best ranked teams.)
Valsta Syrianska IK	Upplands FF	Highest ranked team
Strömsbergs IF	Upplands FF	2nd highest ranked team
Upsala IF	Upplands FF	2013 Upplandscupen winner
Carlstad United	Värmlands FF	2014 Time2Change Cup winner
Karlstad BK	Värmlands FF	2014 Time2Change Cup runner-up
Sandviks IK	Västerbottens FF	2013 Distriktsmästerskapet winner
Skövde AIK	Västergötlands FF	2013 Intersport Cup winner
Skoftebyns IF	Västergötlands FF	2013 Intersport Cup runner-up
Norrby IF	Västergötlands FF	2013 Intersport Cup semi-finalist
Kinna IF	Västergötlands FF	2013 Intersport Cup best quarter-finalist
IK Gauthiod	Västergötlands FF	2013 Intersport Cup 2nd best quarter-finalist
FC Trollhättan	Västergötlands FF	2013 Intersport Cup 3rd best quarter-finalist (Note: Received a place since semi-finalists IF Elfsborg were automatically qualified for Round 2 as an Allsvenskan team.)
Västerås SK	Västmanlands FF	Highest ranked team
Sollefteå GIF	Ångermanlands FF	2014 Distriktsmästerskapet winner
IFK Kumla	Örebro Läns FF	Qualification tournament winner
Nora-Pershyttan BK	Örebro Läns FF	Qualification tournament winner
Motala AIF	Östergötland FF	2013 Östgötacupen winner
IF Sylvia	Östergötland FF	2013 Östgötacupen semi-finalist (Note: Received a place since runners-up IFK Norrköping were automatically qualified for Round 2 as an Allsvenskan team.)
Eneby BK	Östergötland FF	2013 Östgötacupen semi-finalist

== Dalarnas FF qualification ==
The first round commenced on 13 March 2014 and the final was contested on 28 May 2014. The five highest ranked teams entered teams entered in the quarter-finals. The number in brackets, indicate what tier of Swedish football each team competed in for the 2014 season.

13 March 2014 Round 1	Vansbro AIK (7)	0–7	IFK Mora (6)	Mora
19:30		Report	Finsén 18', 29', 32', 42'; Olsson 48'; Berisha 52', 59'	Stadium: Prästholmens IP; Attendance: 52; Referee: Jesper Myrlund (Mora)

15 March 2014 Round 1	Slätta SK (7)	2–0	Skogsbo-Avesta IF (6)	Falun
11:00	Edquist 7'; H. Nordahl 55'	Report		Stadium: Kopparvallen; Attendance: 30; Referee: Andreas Hansen (Borlänge)

16 March 2014 Round 1	Stora Tuna IK (8)	1–3	Ulfshyttans IF (6)	Borlänge
10:00	P. Karlsson 4'	Report	Jernberg 20'; Johansson 56'; Olsson 78'	Stadium: Domnarvsvallen; Attendance: 100; Referee: Almir Alisić (Borlänge)

22 March 2014 Quarter-finals	IFK Mora (6)	2–1 (a.e.t.)	Korsnäs IF (5)	Mora
15:00	Berisha 97'; Rylander 101'	Report	Edman 92'	Stadium: Prästholmens IP; Attendance: 80; Referee: Johan Söderström (Borlänge)

23 March 2014 Quarter-finals	Islingby IK (6)	0–4	Avesta AIK (5)	Avesta
14:00		Report	Berg 13'; Schultz-Eklund 67'; Persson 72', 80'	Stadium: Avestavallen; Attendance: 69; Referee: Björn Andersson (Borlänge)

30 March 2014 Quarter-finals	IK Brage (3)	5–1	Slätta SK (7)	Falun
15:00	O. Lundin 5'; Ayik 11'; Zetterström 38'; Hedman 54'; Forsberg 69'	Report	Edquist 28'	Stadium: Kopparvallen; Attendance: 46; Referee: Erik Nordqvist (Borlänge)

31 March 2014 Quarter-finals	Ulfshyttans IF (6)	0–8	Dalkurd FF (3)	Borlänge
17:00		Report	Awad 10', 39'; Persson 13'; Jagne 29'; Lindmark 53', 80'; Suljević 59'; Azizi 65'	Stadium: Domnarvsvallen; Referee: Robert Nyberg (Borlänge)

9 April 2014 Semi-finals	Dalkurd FF (3)	4–0	IFK Mora (6)	Mora
19:00	Alemayehu 26'; Lindmark 45'; Berbatovci 63'; Omoh 84'	Report		Stadium: Prästholmens IP; Attendance: 230; Referee: Henrik Matsson (Mora)

16 April 2014 Semi-finals	Avesta AIK (5)	1–2	IK Brage (3)	Avesta
19:00	Gauffin Eriksson 82'	Report	Magnusson 15'; A. Lundin 33' (pen.)	Stadium: Avestavallen; Attendance: 150; Referee: Patrik Larsson (Borlänge)

28 May 2014 Final	IK Brage (3)	1–2	Dalkurd FF (3)	Borlänge
19:00	A. Lundin 88'	Report	Omoh 9'; Persson 55'	Stadium: Domnarvsvallen; Attendance: 1,418; Referee: Patrik Larsson (Borlänge)

== Örebro Läns FF qualification ==
The first match was played on 5 March 2014 and the last match was played on 13 May 2014. The number in brackets, indicate what tier of Swedish football each team competed in for the 2014 season.

Key to colours in group tables
Group winners and best runner-up advanced to next round

=== Group 1 ===
Pos	Team	Pld	W	D	L	GF	GA	GD	Pts	Qualification	NPBK	KIF	IKS
1	Nora-Pershyttan BK (Q)	2	2	0	0	4	1	+3	6	Advance to Final round	—	2–0	—
2	Karlslunds IF HFK	2	1	0	1	2	3	−1	3		—	—	2–1
3	IK Sturehov	2	0	0	2	2	4	−2	0		1–2	—	—

Source: svenskfotboll.se (in Swedish)
Rules for classification: 1) Points; 2) Goal difference; 3) Number of goals scored
(Q) Qualified for the phase indicated

6 March 2014 Matchday 1	Nora-Pershyttan BK (6)	2–0	Karlslunds IF (4)	Örebro
18:00	Steiner 26'; Anell 39'	Report		Stadium: Karlslund Arena; Attendance: 67; Referee: Johan Eriksson (Kumla)

16 March 2014 Matchday 2	IK Sturehov (5)	1–2	Nora-Pershyttan BK (6)	Hallsberg
16:15	Berisha 70'	Report	Karlsson Lomjabok 74'; Mostafa 77'	Stadium: Allévallen; Attendance: 50; Referee: Namik Idrizović (Örebro)

29 March 2014 Matchday 3	Karlslunds IF (4)	2–1	IK Sturehov (5)	Örebro
13:00	H. Kuhi; Molin	Report	Krona	Stadium: Karlslund Arena; Referee: Kalle Jansson (Örebro)

=== Group 2 ===
Pos	Team	Pld	W	D	L	GF	GA	GD	Pts	Qualification	RIK	ÖSIF	VIF
1	Rynninge IK (Q)	2	2	0	0	13	2	+11	6	Advance to Final round	—	6–1	—
2	Örebro Syrianska IF	2	1	0	1	4	7	−3	3		—	—	3–1
3	Vretstorps IF	2	0	0	2	2	10	−8	0		1–7	—	—

Source: svenskfotboll.se (in Swedish)
Rules for classification: 1) Points; 2) Goal difference; 3) Number of goals scored
(Q) Qualified for the phase indicated

23 March 2014 Matchday 1	Vretstorps IF (6)	1–7	Rynninge IK (4)	Hallsberg
18:15	A. Erixon 90'	Report	Diawara 18'; Karahmet 23', 47', 54'; Florén 45' (pen.); Pers 55'; Pavičević 87'	Stadium: Allévallen; Attendance: 50; Referee: Namik Idrizović (Örebro)

16 March 2014 Matchday 2	Örebro Syrianska IF (5)	3–1	Vretstorps IF (6)	Örebro
18:00	Can 34'; Surville 30'; Nasir 73'	Report	A. Erixon 53'	Stadium: Karlslund Arena; Attendance: 72; Referee: Ahmed Abid (Örebro)

29 March 2014 Matchday 3	Rynninge IK (4)	6–1	Örebro Syrianska IF (5)	Örebro
15:00	Åwall 5' (pen.); Klinton 10', 71'; Florén 58'; Karahmet 83'; Lindqvist 88'	Report	Jelečak 60'	Stadium: Pettersbergs IP; Attendance: 84; Referee: Johan Eriksson (Kumla)

=== Group 3 ===
Pos	Team	Pld	W	D	L	GF	GA	GD	Pts	Qualification	BKF	IFKK	MIK
1	BK Forward (Q)	2	2	0	0	10	1	+9	6	Advance to Final round	—	4–1	—
2	IFK Kumla (Q)	2	1	0	1	6	5	+1	3	Advance to Final round	—	—	5–1
3	Mariebergs IK	2	0	0	2	1	11	−10	0		0–6	—	—

Source: svenskfotboll.se (in Swedish)
Rules for classification: 1) Points; 2) Goal difference; 3) Number of goals scored
(Q) Qualified for the phase indicated

5 March 2014 Matchday 1	Mariebergs IK (6)	0–6	BK Forward (3)	Örebro
19:30		Report	Lamu 14', 19'; Alp 43'; Bukva 50'; Walker 69'; Björndahl 81'	Stadium: Behrn Arena; Referee: Samir Bahtijaragić (Örebro)

15 March 2014 Matchday 2	IFK Kumla (5)	5–1	Mariebergs IK (6)	Kumla
14:00	Arnold 16'; 34' (o.g.); J. Åberg 55'; Čorić 58'; Magnusson 84'	Report	Hedman 74'	Stadium: Kumla IP; Referee: Rasmus Ekelund (Örebro)

2 April 2014 Matchday 3	BK Forward (3)	4–1	IFK Kumla (5)	Kumla
19:00	Lamu 9'; Alp 18'; Bukva 46', 73'	Report	Rohlén 41'	Stadium: Kumla IP; Attendance: 100; Referee: Namik Idrizović (Örebro)

=== Final round ===
The winners of the final round entered the first round of 2014–15 Svenska Cupen.

22 April 2014	Rynninge IK (4)	1–1 (5–6 p)	IFK Kumla (5)	Örebro
19:00	Åwall 90' (pen.)	Report	Magnusson 88'	Stadium: Pettersbergs IP; Attendance: 120; Referee: Salko Bašić (Kumla)
	Penalties
	Pers (penalty scored); Florén (penalty scored); Karahmet (penalty scored); Åwall (penalty scored); Palm (penalty scored) (penalty missed)		(penalty scored) Marlowe; (penalty scored) Sjölinder; (penalty scored) Karlsson; (penalty scored) J. Åberg; (penalty scored) Magnusson; (penalty scored) P. Åberg

13 May 2014	Nora-Pershyttan BK (6)	2–2 (4–2 p)	BK Forward (3)	Nora
19:00	Ielo 85' (pen.), 90' (pen.)	Report	Ring 12'; Albertson 29' (pen.)	Stadium: Norvalla IP; Attendance: 220; Referee: Johan Eriksson (Kumla)
	Penalties
	Henriksson (penalty scored); Steiner (penalty scored); Mostafa (penalty scored); Dahlkvist (penalty scored)		(penalty scored) Bulun; (penalty missed) Wettéus; (penalty scored) Björndahl; (penalty missed) Ring
