= 2014 in Swedish football =

Football in Sweden
- Season: 2014

Men's football
- Allsvenskan: Malmö FF
- Superettan: Hammarby IF
- Division 1: AFC United (Norra); Utsiktens BK (Södra)
- Svenska Cupen: IF Elfsborg
- Svenska Supercupen: Malmö FF

The 2014 season was the 117th season of competitive football in Sweden. The competitive started with the group stage of Svenska Cupen on 1 March. League competition started late March and early April with Allsvenskan on 30 March, Superettan on 6 April, Damallsvenskan on 13 April and Division 1 on 20 April. Svenska Cupen ended with the final on 18 May. Damallsvenskan ended on 19 October, Allsvenskan and Division 1 ended on 1 November, Superettan one day later on 2 November and lower men's leagues on the weekend before. Qualification play-offs were held after the end of league play with the Allsvenskan and Superettan play-offs being held on 6 and 9 November. Svenska Supercupen was held on 9 November and was contested by the winner of Allsvenskan and Svenska Cupen. Sweden participated in qualifying for the UEFA Euro 2016.

== Honours ==
=== Men's football ===
==== Official titles ====
Title	Team	Reason
Swedish Champions 2014	Malmö FF	Winners of Allsvenskan
Swedish Cup Champions 2013–14	IF Elfsborg	Winners of Svenska Cupen
Swedish Super Cup Champions 2014	Malmö FF	Winners of Svenska Supercupen

==== Competitions ====
Level	Competition	Team
1st level	2014 Allsvenskan	Malmö FF
2nd level	2014 Superettan	Hammarby IF
3rd level	2014 Swedish football Division 1 Norra	AFC United
3rd level	2014 Swedish football Division 1 Södra	Utsiktens BK
National cup	2013–14 Svenska Cupen	IF Elfsborg
Super cup	2014 Svenska Supercupen	Malmö FF

=== Women's football ===
==== Official titles ====
Title	Team	Reason
Swedish Champions 2014	FC Rosengård	Winners of Damallsvenskan
Swedish Cup Champions 2013–14	Linköpings FC	Winners of Svenska Cupen

==== Competitions ====
Level	Competition	Team
1st level	2014 Damallsvenskan	FC Rosengård
2nd level	2014 Elitettan	Mallbackens IF
National cup	2013–14 Svenska Cupen	Linköpings FC

== Promotions, relegations and qualifications ==
=== Men's football ===
==== Promotions ====
Promoted from	Promoted to	Team	Reason
2014 Superettan	2015 Allsvenskan	Hammarby IF	Winners
2014 Superettan	2015 Allsvenskan	GIF Sundsvall	Runners-up
2014 Division 1 Norra	2015 Superettan	AFC United	Winners
2014 Division 1 Norra	2015 Superettan	IK Frej	Play-off winners
2014 Division 1 Södra	2015 Superettan	Utsiktens BK	Winners
2014 Division 2	2015 Division 1 Norra	Piteå IF	Winners of group
2014 Division 2	2015 Division 1 Norra	Akropolis IF	Winners of group
2014 Division 2	2015 Division 1 Norra	Södertälje FK	Winners of group
2014 Division 2	2015 Division 1 Norra	Carlstad United BK	Winners of group
2014 Division 2	2015 Division 1 Södra	FC Höllviken	Winners of group
2014 Division 2	2015 Division 1 Södra	Eskilsminne IF	Winners of group

==== Relegations ====
Relegated from	Relegated to	Team	Reason
2014 Allsvenskan	2015 Superettan	Mjällby AIF	15th team
2014 Allsvenskan	2015 Superettan	IF Brommapojkarna	16th team
2014 Superettan	2015 Division 1 Södra	Östers IF	Play-off losers
2014 Superettan	2015 Division 1 Södra	Landskrona BoIS	15th team
2014 Superettan	2015 Division 1 Södra	Husqvarna FF	16th team
2014 Division 1 Norra	2015 Division 2	IF Sylvia	12th team
2014 Division 1 Norra	2015 Division 2	Valsta Syrianska IK	13th team
2014 Division 1 Norra	2015 Division 2	Skellefteå FF	14th team
2014 Division 1 Södra	2015 Division 2	FC Trollhättan	12th team
2014 Division 1 Södra	2015 Division 2	Skövde AIK	13th team
2014 Division 1 Södra	2015 Division 2	IFK Uddevalla	14th team

==== International qualifications ====
Qualified for	Enters	Team	Reason
2015–16 UEFA Champions League	2nd qual. round	Malmö FF	Winners of 2014 Allsvenskan
2015–16 UEFA Europa League	1st qual. round	IFK Göteborg	Runners-up of 2014 Allsvenskan
2015–16 UEFA Europa League	1st qual. round	AIK	3rd team of 2014 Allsvenskan
2015–16 UEFA Europa League	1st qual. round	TBD	Winners of 2014–15 Svenska Cupen

== Domestic results ==
=== Men's football ===
==== 2014 Allsvenskan ====
Locations of the 2014 Allsvenskan teams

Pos	Team	Pld	W	D	L	GF	GA	GD	Pts	Qualification or relegation
1	Malmö FF (C)	30	18	8	4	59	31	+28	62	Qualification to Champions League second qualifying round
2	IFK Göteborg	30	15	11	4	58	34	+24	56	Qualification to Europa League second qualifying round (Note: IFK Göteborg qualified for the UEFA Europa League second qualifying round by winning 2014–15 Svenska Cupen.)
3	AIK	30	15	7	8	59	42	+17	52	Qualification to Europa League first qualifying round (Note: IF Elfsborg qualified for the UEFA Europa League first qualifying round as the fourth-placed team since IFK Göteborg, winners of the 2014–15 Svenska Cupen, already qualified based on league position.)
4	IF Elfsborg	30	15	7	8	40	31	+9	52	Qualification to Europa League first qualifying round
5	BK Häcken	30	13	7	10	58	45	+13	46	
6	Örebro SK	30	13	7	10	54	44	+10	46	
7	Djurgårdens IF	30	11	10	9	47	33	+14	43	
8	Åtvidabergs FF	30	12	7	11	39	46	−7	43	
9	Helsingborgs IF	30	10	9	11	41	44	−3	39	
10	Halmstads BK	30	11	6	13	44	50	−6	39	
11	Kalmar FF	30	10	9	11	36	45	−9	39	
12	IFK Norrköping	30	9	9	12	39	50	−11	36	
13	Falkenbergs FF	30	9	6	15	37	49	−12	33	
14	Gefle IF (O)	30	8	8	14	34	42	−8	32	Qualification to Relegation play-offs
15	Mjällby AIF (R)	30	8	5	17	29	47	−18	29	Relegation to Superettan
16	IF Brommapojkarna (R)	30	2	6	22	28	69	−41	12	Relegation to Superettan

Source: svenskfotboll.se (in Swedish)
Rules for classification: 1) points; 2) goal difference; 3) number of goals scored; 4) head-to-head points; 5) head-to-head goal difference; 6) head-to-head away goals scored
(C) Champions; (O) Play-off winners; (R) Relegated

==== 2014 Allsvenskan qualification play-offs ====
6 November 2014
18:30 UTC+1

Ljungskile SK	1–3	Gefle IF
Olsson 12'	Report	Oremo 18' (pen.); Lantto 51'; Williams 55'

Skarsjövallen, Ljungskile
Attendance: 1,973
Referee: Michael Lerjéus (Skövde)

9 November 2014
14:30 UTC+1

Gefle IF	1–0	Ljungskile SK
Lundevall 52'	Report

Strömvallen, Gävle
Attendance: 4,228
Referee: Andreas Ekberg (Lund)

Gefle IF won 4–1 on aggregate.

==== 2014 Superettan ====
Location of the 2014 Superettan teams

Pos	Team	Pld	W	D	L	GF	GA	GD	Pts	Promotion, qualification or relegation
1	Hammarby IF (C, P)	30	18	7	5	68	27	+41	61	Promotion to Allsvenskan
2	GIF Sundsvall (P)	30	19	4	7	55	34	+21	61	Promotion to Allsvenskan
3	Ljungskile SK	30	16	12	2	60	25	+35	60	Qualification to Promotion playoffs
4	Jönköpings Södra IF	30	16	4	10	60	42	+18	52	
5	Östersunds FK	30	12	9	9	40	40	0	45	
6	IK Sirius	30	11	10	9	47	36	+11	43	
7	Degerfors IF	30	10	10	10	47	46	+1	40	
8	Varbergs BoIS	30	10	9	11	38	43	−5	39	
9	IFK Värnamo	30	10	9	11	43	52	−9	39	
10	Syrianska FC	30	11	4	15	37	55	−18	37	
11	GAIS	30	9	8	13	31	38	−7	35	
12	Ängelholms FF	30	9	8	13	30	51	−21	35	
13	Östers IF (R)	30	7	11	12	39	48	−9	32	Qualification to Relegation playoffs
14	Assyriska FF (O)	30	5	12	13	28	44	−16	27	Qualification to Relegation playoffs
15	Landskrona BoIS (R)	30	6	8	16	35	55	−20	26	Relegation to Division 1
16	Husqvarna FF (R)	30	5	7	18	27	49	−22	22	Relegation to Division 1

Source: svenskfotboll.se (in Swedish)
Rules for classification: 1) points; 2) goal difference; 3) number of goals scored.
(C) Champions; (O) Play-off winners; (P) Promoted; (R) Relegated

==== 2014 Superettan qualification play-offs ====
6 November 2014
19:00 UTC+1

IK Frej	3–0	Östers IF
Lallet 51'; Plavšić 53'; Silfver 55'	Report

Vikingavallen, Täby
Attendance: 1,684
Referee: Per Melin (Gävle)
6 November 2014
19:00 UTC+1

Örgryte IS	1–1	Assyriska FF
Mourad 78'	Report	Papagiannopoulos 39'

Gamla Ullevi, Gothenburg
Attendance: 3,227
Referee: Kaspar Sjöberg (Malmö)

9 November 2014
15:00 UTC+1

Östers IF	3–2	IK Frej
Henningsson 6', 67'; Velić 56'	Report	Lallet 19'; Plavšić 53'

Myresjöhus Arena, Växjö
Attendance: 2,685
Referee: Antti Kanerva (Olofstorp)

IK Frej won 5–3 on aggregate.

9 November 2014
15:00 UTC+1

Assyriska FF	0–0	Örgryte IS
	Report

Södertälje Fotbollsarena, Södertälje
Attendance: 2,511
Referee: Jim Petersson (Motala)

1–1 on aggregate. Assyriska FF won on away goals.

==== 2014 Division 1 ====
Location of the 2014 Division 1 teams. Division 1 Norra are red dots while Division 1 Södra are green dots.

===== Norra =====
Pos	Team	Pld	W	D	L	GF	GA	GD	Pts	Qualification or relegation
1	AFC United (C, P)	26	19	1	6	52	22	+30	58	Promotion to Superettan
2	IK Frej (O, P)	26	16	7	3	44	21	+23	55	Qualification to Promotion playoffs
3	Dalkurd FF	26	16	6	4	44	20	+24	54	
4	IK Brage	26	15	6	5	40	25	+15	51	
5	Vasalunds IF	26	12	3	11	37	43	−6	39	
6	BK Forward	26	11	4	11	43	40	+3	37	
7	Nyköpings BIS	26	11	2	13	38	33	+5	35	
8	Huddinge IF	26	10	4	12	32	34	−2	34	
9	Umeå FC	26	9	6	11	38	35	+3	33	
10	IFK Luleå	26	7	10	9	39	40	−1	31	
11	Västerås SK	26	7	3	16	38	52	−14	24	
12	IF Sylvia (R)	26	6	5	15	36	53	−17	23	Relegation to Division 2
13	Valsta Syrianska IK (R)	26	6	4	16	40	59	−19	22	Relegation to Division 2
14	Skellefteå FF (R)	26	6	1	19	28	72	−44	19	Relegation to Division 2

Source: svenskfotboll.se (in Swedish)
Rules for classification: 1) points; 2) goal difference; 3) number of goals scored.
(C) Champions; (O) Play-off winners; (P) Promoted; (R) Relegated

===== Södra =====
Pos	Team	Pld	W	D	L	GF	GA	GD	Pts	Qualification or relegation
1	Utsiktens BK (C, P)	26	17	4	5	47	26	+21	55	Promotion to Superettan
2	Örgryte IS	26	14	6	6	45	33	+12	48	Qualification to Promotion playoffs
3	Lunds BK	26	13	5	8	66	45	+21	44	
4	Motala AIF	26	13	5	8	53	37	+16	44	
5	IK Oddevold	26	12	5	9	43	44	−1	41	
6	Norrby IF	26	10	6	10	51	45	+6	36	
7	IS Halmia	26	10	6	10	39	37	+2	36	
8	Qviding FIF	26	10	5	11	35	38	−3	35	
9	Oskarshamns AIK	26	9	7	10	39	45	−6	34	
10	Kristianstads FF	26	9	7	10	33	44	−11	34	
11	Trelleborgs FF	26	8	8	10	36	34	+2	32	
12	FC Trollhättan (R)	26	9	5	12	42	44	−2	32	Relegation to Division 2
13	Skövde AIK (R)	26	4	7	15	29	50	−21	19	Relegation to Division 2
14	IFK Uddevalla (R)	26	3	6	17	23	59	−36	15	Relegation to Division 2

Source: svenskfotboll.se (in Swedish)
Rules for classification: 1) points; 2) goal difference; 3) number of goals scored.
(C) Champions; (P) Promoted; (R) Relegated

==== 2013–14 Svenska Cupen ====
===== Quarter-finals =====
22 March 2014
15:00 UTC+2

Helsingborgs IF (1)	2–1	GAIS (2)
Accam 50'; Santos 54'	Report	Warshaw 6'

Olympia, Helsingborg
Attendance: 2,530
Referee: Mohammed Al-Hakim (Köping)

22 March 2014
15:00 UTC+2

Malmö FF (1)	2–0	IF Brommapojkarna (1)
Helander 59'; Kroon 86'	Report

Swedbank Stadion, Malmö
Attendance: 3,442
Referee: Andreas Ekberg (Lund)

23 March 2014
15:00 UTC+2

IFK Göteborg (1)	0–1	IK Sirius (2)
	Report	Ogbu 29'

Ullevi, Gothenburg
Attendance: 4,689
Referee: Bojan Pandžić (Gothenburg)

23 March 2014
15:00 UTC+2

IF Elfsborg (1)	1–0	BK Häcken (1)
Rohdén 67'	Report

Borås Arena, Borås
Attendance: 2,228
Referee: Markus Strömbergsson (Gävle)

===== Semi-finals =====
1 May 2014
15:00 UTC+2

Malmö FF (1)	0–2	Helsingborgs IF (1)
	Report	Uronen 27'; Accam 90'

Swedbank Stadion, Malmö
Attendance: 8,540
Referee: Martin Hansson (Holmsjö)

1 May 2014
15:00 UTC+2

IK Sirius (2)	1–4	IF Elfsborg (1)
Silva 90'	Report	Prodell 7', 52', 82' (pen.); Hauger 13'

Studenternas IP, Uppsala
Attendance: 6,000
Referee: Andreas Ekberg (Lund)

===== Final =====
18 May 2014
17:00 UTC+2

Helsingborgs IF (1)	0–1	IF Elfsborg (1)
	Report	Nilsson 54'

Friends Arena, Solna
Attendance: 3,423
Referee: Michael Lerjéus (Skövde)

==== 2014 Svenska Supercupen ====
9 November 2014
18:15 UTC+1

Malmö FF	2–2 (a.e.t.)	IF Elfsborg
Kiese Thelin 89'; Forsberg 114'	Report	Claesson 22'; Prodell 124' (pen.)
Penalties
Tinnerholm (penalty scored); Forsberg (penalty scored); Kroon (penalty scored); Cibicki (penalty missed); Kiese Thelin (penalty scored); Rakip (penalty scored)	5–4	(penalty scored) Frick; (penalty scored) Prodell; (penalty scored) Rohdén; (penalty scored) Larsson; (penalty missed) Hedlund; (penalty missed) Beckmann

Malmö Stadion, Malmö
Attendance: 1,266
Referee: Martin Strömbergsson (Gävle)

=== Women's football ===
==== 2014 Damallsvenskan ====
Pos	Team	Pld	W	D	L	GF	GA	GD	Pts	Qualification or relegation
1	FC Rosengård (C, Q)	20	18	0	2	62	17	+45	54	Qualification to Champions League Round of 32
2	KIF Örebro DFF (Q)	20	14	0	6	32	14	+18	42	Qualification to Champions League Round of 32
3	Kopparbergs/Göteborg FC	20	12	3	5	50	21	+29	39	
4	Linköpings FC	20	11	5	4	43	19	+24	38	
5	Kristianstads DFF	20	9	4	7	21	18	+3	31	
6	Umeå IK	20	8	3	9	35	29	+6	27	
7	Eskilstuna United DFF	20	6	8	6	25	31	−6	26	
8	Vittsjö GIK	20	7	2	11	21	40	−19	23	
9	Piteå IF	20	6	3	11	22	32	−10	21	
10	AIK	20	4	2	14	13	48	−35	14	
11	Jitex BK (R)	20	0	0	20	6	61	−55	0	Relegation to Elitettan
–	Tyresö FF (D, R)	0	0	0	0	0	0	0	0	Withdrawn and relegation to Division 2 (Note: On 5 June 2014, Tyresö FF withdrew from the league due to lack of players and financial reasons, and was relegated to the fourth-tier league Division 2. Tyresö had at that time played eight matches, which were then nullified and deleted from the table, and stood at place 9 of 12. As a result, only one other team was relegated to Elitettan at the end of the season.)

Source: svenskfotboll.se (in Swedish)
Rules for classification: 1) Points; 2) Goal difference; 3) Number of goals scored; 4) Head-to-head points; 5) Head-to-head goal difference; 6) Head-to-head away goals scored
(C) Champions; (D) Disqualified; (Q) Qualified for the phase indicated; (R) Relegated

== Men's national team fixtures and results ==
17 January 2014 Friendly	Moldova	1–2	Sweden	Abu Dhabi, United Arab Emirates
20:00 UTC+4	Henrique 45'	Report	Fejzullahu 76', 86'	Stadium: Mohammed Bin Zayed Stadium; Referee: Jameel Juma (Bahrain)

21 January 2014 Friendly	Iceland	0–2	Sweden	Abu Dhabi, United Arab Emirates
20:00 UTC+4		Report	Quaison 33'; Molins 62'	Stadium: Mohammed Bin Zayed Stadium; Referee: Al Awaji Marai (Saudi Arabia)

5 March 2014 Friendly	Turkey	2–1	Sweden	Ankara, Turkey
20:30 UTC+2	Erdinç 2'; Adın 57'	Report	Toivonen 54'	Stadium: Ankara 19 Mayıs Stadium; Attendance: 19,200; Referee: Milorad Mažić (Serbia)

28 May 2014 Friendly	Denmark	1–0	Sweden	Copenhagen, Denmark
20:15 UTC+2	Agger 90+3' (pen.)	Report		Stadium: Parken Stadium; Attendance: 27,872; Referee: Svein Oddvar Moen (Norway)

1 June 2014 Friendly	Sweden	0–2	Belgium	Solna, Sweden
20:30 UTC+2		Report	Lukaku 34'; Hazard 78'	Stadium: Friends Arena; Attendance: 24,732; Referee: Mark Clattenburg (England)

4 September 2014 Friendly	Sweden	2–0	Estonia	Solna, Sweden
19:45 UTC+2	Ibrahimović 3', 24'	Report		Stadium: Friends Arena; Attendance: 15,421; Referee: Kristinn Jakobsson (Iceland)

8 September 2014 UEFA Euro 2016 Q Group G	Austria	1–1	Sweden	Vienna, Austria
20:45 UTC+2	Alaba 7' (pen.)	Report	Zengin 12'	Stadium: Ernst-Happel-Stadion; Attendance: 48,500; Referee: Pavel Královec (Czech Republic)

9 October 2014 UEFA Euro 2016 Q Group G	Sweden	1–1	Russia	Solna, Sweden
20:45 UTC+2	Toivonen 49'	Report	Kokorin 10'	Stadium: Friends Arena; Attendance: 49,023; Referee: Nicola Rizzoli (Italy)

12 October 2014 UEFA Euro 2016 Q Group G	Sweden	2–0	Liechtenstein	Solna, Sweden
20:45 UTC+2	Zengin 34'; Durmaz 46'	Report		Stadium: Friends Arena; Attendance: 22,528; Referee: Gediminas Mažeika (Lithuania)

15 November 2014 UEFA Euro 2016 Q Group G	Montenegro	1–1	Sweden	Podgorica, Montenegro
20:45 UTC+1	Jovetić 80' (pen.)	Report	Ibrahimović 9'	Stadium: Podgorica City Stadium; Attendance: 10,538; Referee: Willie Collum (Scotland)

18 November 2014 Friendly	France	1–0	Sweden	Marseille, France
21:00 UTC+1	Varane 83'	Report		Stadium: Stade Vélodrome; Attendance: 55,000; Referee: Jesús Gil Manzano (Spain)

=== Goalscorers ===
Rank	Player	Club	Goals
1	Zlatan Ibrahimović	(France) Paris Saint-Germain	3
2	Erton Fejzullahu	(Sweden) Djurgårdens IF	2
2	Ola Toivonen	(France) Rennes	2
2	Erkan Zengin	(Turkey) Eskişehirspor	2
5	Jimmy Durmaz	(Greece) Olympiacos	1
5	Guillermo Molins	(Sweden) Malmö FF	1
5	Robin Quaison	(Sweden) AIK	1

== Swedish clubs' performance in Europe ==
These are the results of the Swedish teams in European competitions during the 2014–15 season. (Swedish team score displayed first)

=== Men's football ===
Team	Contest	Round	Opponent	1st leg score*	2nd leg score**	Aggregate score
Malmö FF	UEFA Champions League	Second qualifying round	(Latvia) Ventspils	0–0	1–0	W 1–0
Malmö FF	UEFA Champions League	Third qualifying round	(Czech Republic) Sparta Prague	2–4	2–0	W 4–4 (ag)
Malmö FF	UEFA Champions League	Play-off round	(Austria) Red Bull Salzburg	1–2	3–0	W 4–2
Malmö FF	UEFA Champions League	Group stage	(Spain) Atlético Madrid	0–2	0–5	None
Malmö FF	UEFA Champions League	Group stage	(Italy) Juventus	0–2	0–2	None
Malmö FF	UEFA Champions League	Group stage	(Greece) Olympiacos	2–0	2–4	None
IF Elfsborg	UEFA Europa League	Second qualifying round	(Azerbaijan) Inter Baku	0–1	1–0	W 5–4 (ap)
IF Elfsborg	UEFA Europa League	Third qualifying round	(Iceland) FH	4–1	1–2	W 5–3
IF Elfsborg	UEFA Europa League	Play-off round	(Portugal) Rio Ave	2–1	0–1	L 2–2 (ag)
AIK	UEFA Europa League	Second qualifying round	(Northern Ireland) Linfield	0–1	2–0	W 2–1
AIK	UEFA Europa League	Third qualifying round	(Kazakhstan) Astana	1–1	0–3	L 1–4
IFK Göteborg	UEFA Europa League	First qualifying round	(Luxembourg) Fola Esch	0–0	2–0	W 2–0
IFK Göteborg	UEFA Europa League	Second qualifying round	(Hungary) Győr	3–0	0–1	W 3–1
IFK Göteborg	UEFA Europa League	Third qualifying round	(Portugal) Rio Ave	0–1	0–0	L 0–1
IF Brommapojkarna	UEFA Europa League	First qualifying round	(Finland) VPS	1–2	2–0	W 3–2
IF Brommapojkarna	UEFA Europa League	Second qualifying round	(Northern Ireland) Crusaders	4–0	1–1	W 5–1
IF Brommapojkarna	UEFA Europa League	Third qualifying round	(Italy) Torino	0–3	0–4	L 0–7

* For group games in UEFA Champions League, score in home game is displayed
** For group games in UEFA Champions League, score in away game is displayed

=== Women's football ===
Team	Contest	Round	Opponent	1st leg score	2nd leg score	Aggregate score
FC Rosengård	UEFA Women's Champions League	Round of 32	(Russia) Ryazan VDV	3–1	2–0	W 5–1
FC Rosengård	UEFA Women's Champions League	Round of 16	(Denmark) Fortuna Hjørring	2–1	2–0	W 4–1
FC Rosengård	UEFA Women's Champions League	Quarter-finals	(Germany) Wolfsburg			
Linköpings FC	UEFA Women's Champions League	Round of 32	(England) Liverpool	1–2	3–0	W 4–2
Linköpings FC	UEFA Women's Champions League	Round of 16	(Russia) Zvezda Perm	5–0	0–3	W 5–3
Linköpings FC	UEFA Women's Champions League	Quarter-finals	(Denmark) Brøndby			

== Fotbollsgalan ==
Fotbollsgalan is the annual award ceremony held by the Swedish Football Association to present individual awards for both men's and women's football. The award ceremony was held on 10 November 2014 at the Ericsson Globe in Stockholm after the end of the domestic season. The nominations for the 2014 season were officially announced on 20 October 2014. Only the general awards are presented here, for league specific awards, see the articles 2014 Allsvenskan and 2014 Damallsvenskan respectively. Nominees are displayed below, the winners are marked in bold text.

**Men's goalkeeper of the year**

- **Andreas Isaksson** (Kasımpaşa)
- Kristoffer Nordfeldt (Heerenveen)
- Robin Olsen (Malmö FF)

**Men's defender of the year**

- **Andreas Granqvist** (Krasnodar)
- Mikael Antonsson (Copenhagen)
- Filip Helander (Malmö FF)

**Men's midfielder of the year**

- **Albin Ekdal** (Cagliari)
- Jimmy Durmaz (Olympiacos)
- Emil Forsberg (Malmö FF)

**Men's forward of the year**

- **Zlatan Ibrahimović** (Paris Saint-Germain)
- Markus Rosenberg (Malmö FF)
- Lasse Vibe (IFK Göteborg)

**Women's goalkeeper of the year**

- **Hedvig Lindahl** (Kristianstads DFF)
- Hilda Carlén (Piteå IF)
- Stephanie Labbé (KIF Örebro)

**Women's defender of the year**

- **Nilla Fischer** (VfL Wolfsburg)
- Lina Nilsson (FC Rosengård)
- Linda Sembrant (Tyresö FF / Montpellier)

**Women's midfielder of the year**

- **Caroline Seger** (Tyresö FF / Paris Saint-Germain)
- Ramona Bachmann (FC Rosengård)
- Mariann Gajhede Knudsen (Linköpings FC)

**Women's forward of the year**

- **Lotta Schelin** (Lyon)
- Manon Melis (Kopparbergs/Göteborg FC)
- Anja Mittag (FC Rosengård)

Guldbollen

- Zlatan Ibrahimović (Paris Saint-Germain)

Diamantbollen

- Lotta Schelin (Lyon)

Referees of the year

- Pernilla Larsson (Ladies)
- Jonas Eriksson (Men)

Goal of the year

- Magnus Eriksson (Malmö FF)

Fotbollskanalen's honorary award

- Tommy Svensson
