= Ritah =

Ritah is a given name. Notable people with the name include:

- Ritah Asiimwe (born 1986), Ugandan badminton player
- Ritah Imanishimwe (born 1996), Ugandan basketball player
- Ritah Kivumbi (born 1995), Ugandan footballer
- Ritah Namayanja Kivumbi (born 1980), Ugandan art director
