= Kivumbi =

Kivumbi is a surname. Notable people with the surname include:

- Muwanga Kivumbi (born 1973), Ugandan economist
- Ritah Kivumbi (born 1995), Ugandan footballer
- Ritah Namayanja Kivumbi (born 1980), Ugandan art director
- Adrian Kivumbi Ddungu (1923–2009), Ugandan priest
