= Nazad Asaad =

Swedish footballer

Personal information
- Date of birth: 4 February 1988 (age 38)
- Place of birth: Erbil, Iraq
- Height: 1.74 m (5 ft 9 in)
- Positions: Midfielder; winger

Youth career
- IFK Trollhättan
- 2002–2005: Malmö FF
- 2005–2007: Udinese

Senior career*
Years	Team	Apps	(Gls)
2007–2009	ŁKS Łódź	3	(0)
2009–2010	AIF Barrikaden		
2010	IF Limhamn Bunkeflo		
2013	Kulladals FF		
2014	BW 90 IF		
2017	GLKS Kamiennik		

International career
2003–2004	Sweden U17	5	(0)
- * Club domestic league appearances and goals

Nazad Asaad (born 4 February 1988) is a Swedish former professional footballer who played as a midfielder and winger.

== Career ==
Asaad was born in Erbil, Iraq, to a Kurdish family.

He was in the Malmö FF youth academy before joining Italian club Udinese in 2005, where he played for the under-19 team for two seasons.

He signed with Polish side ŁKS Łódź in 2007. In his first season at the club, he played in the youth football league Młoda Ekstraklasa. In his second season he made three Ekstraklasa appearances and seven cup appearances, before deciding to end his professional playing career and become a medical doctor.

In 2009 Asaad was playing for AIF Barrikaden in Division 5, the Swedish seventh tier.

For the 2010 season he moved to IF Limhamn Bunkeflo. He helped LB07 beat Landskrona BoIS in the Svenska Cupen scoring the goal in a 1–0 win.

== Personal life ==
Asaad studied medicine in Wrocław. As of April 2019, he was working in a hospital in Karlskoga, Sweden.

== Style of play ==
A winger, Asaad was known for his speed and dribbling.
