= Källbrinks IP =

Sports ground in Huddinge, Sweden

Coordinates: 59.2492°N 17.9469°E

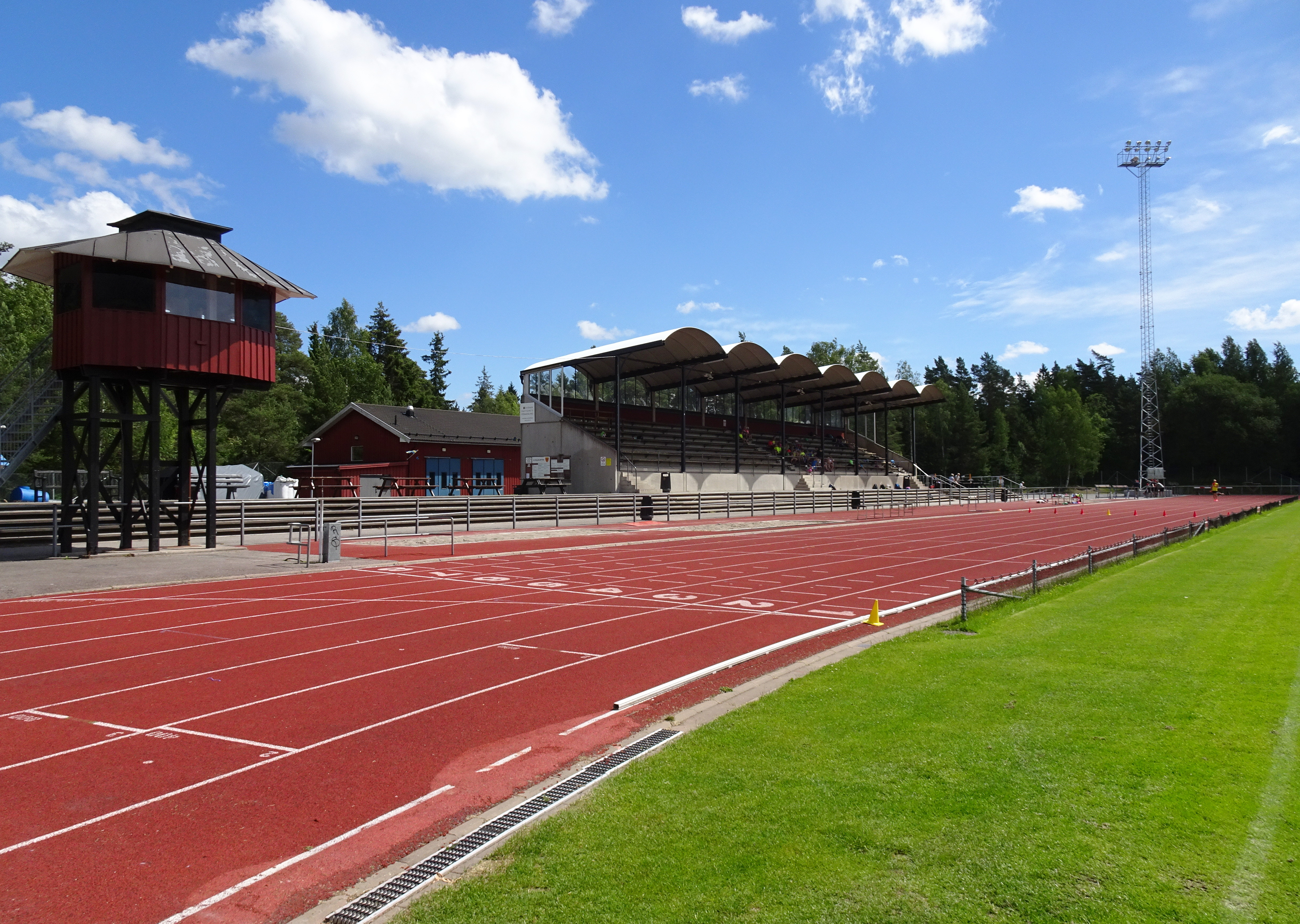
- Interactive map of Källbrinks IP
- Location: Huddinge, Sweden
- Capacity: 2 500
- Type: sports ground

Construction
- Opened: 22 May 1982

Tenants
- Huddinge IF, Spårvägen cykel, Snättringe SK, Huddinge AIS

Källbrinks Idrottsplats or simply Källbrinks IP is a football stadium in Huddinge, Sweden and the home stadium for the football team Huddinge IF. Källbrinks IP has a total capacity of 2 500 spectators.
