= Bovar Karim =

Swedish footballer (born 1984)

Personal information
- Full name: Bovar Mohammed Karim
- Date of birth: 4 May 1984 (age 42)
- Place of birth: Paris, France
- Height: 1.75 m (5 ft 9 in)
- Position: Midfielder

Youth career
- 1995–1999: Malmö FF
- 1999–2001: Feyenoord

Senior career*
Years	Team	Apps	(Gls)
2002–2005	Malmö FF	0	(0)
2005	Malmö Anadolu BI	12	(3)
2005–2007	SC Cambuur	50	
2006–2009	Tromsø IL		
2010	→ Randaberg IL (loan)	6	(7)
2010	IFK Klagshamn	10	(3)
2010	→ IF Limhamn Bunkeflo (loan)	19	(4)
2011–2012	IF Limhamn Bunkeflo	22	(6)
2013	Zakho FC		
2014–2015	BW 90 IF	8	(1)
2015–2016	Prespa Birlik	50	(22)
2017	IFK Malmö		
2017	Malmö City		

International career
1999–2001	Sweden U16	7	(6)
2002–2003	Sweden U19	11	(7)
- * Club domestic league appearances and goals as of 17 January 2017

Bovar Mohammed Karim (Kurdish: Bêwar Mihemmed Kerîm/بێوار محەمد كەريم, born 4 May 1984) is a Swedish footballer.

== Early life ==
Bovar Karim was born in Paris to a Kurdish family and is a son of Sulaymaniya FC's former player Mohammed Karim.
