= Irvina Bajramović =

Swedish footballer (born 1995)

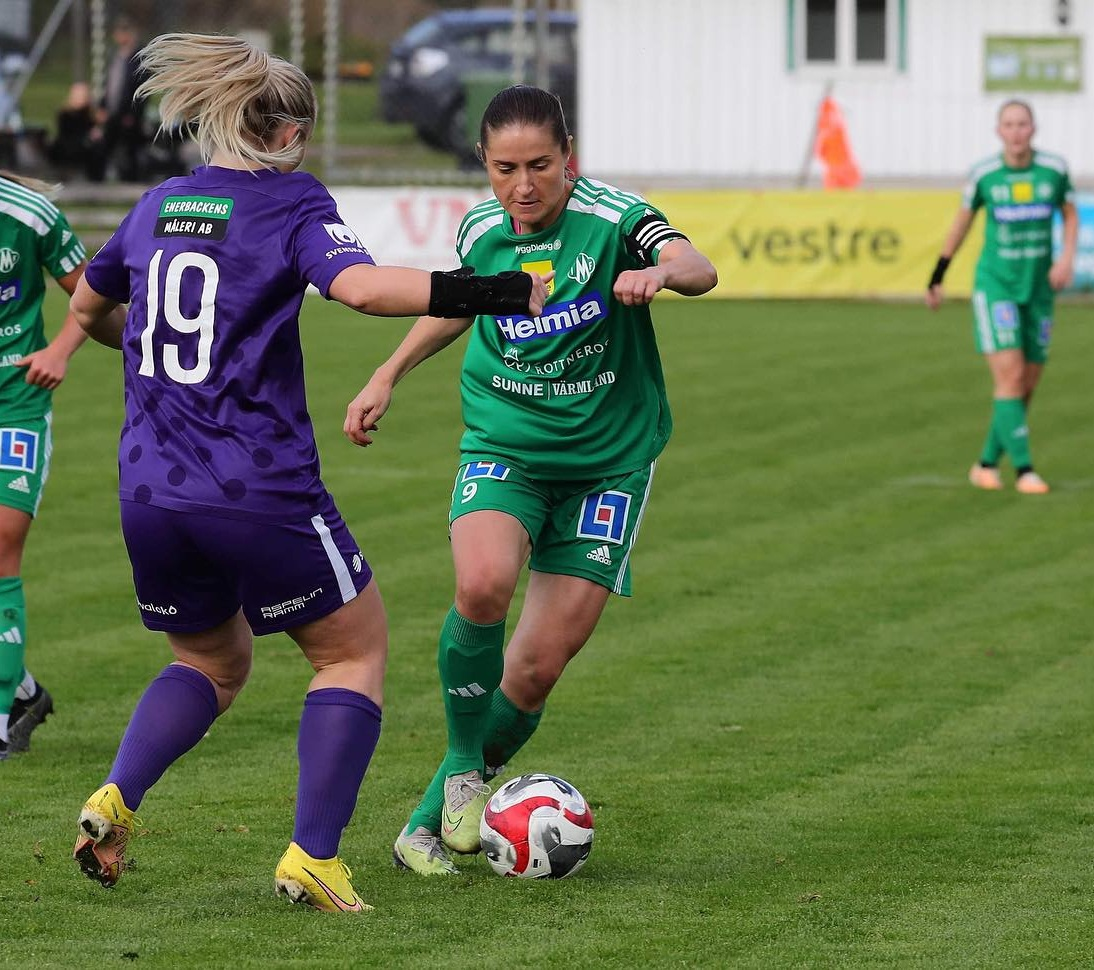

Personal information
- Date of birth: 27 February 1995 (age 31)
- Place of birth: Varekil, Sweden
- Position: Forward

Team information
- Current team: Mallbackens IF
- Number: 15

Senior career*
Years	Team	Apps	(Gls)
2008–2013	Gilleby/Stala Orust FC		
2013	Torslanda IK	7	(0)
2014–2016	IK Rössö Uddevalla	0	(0)
2016–2018	Kopparbergs/Göteborg	17	(0)
2018–2019	IK Rössö Uddevalla	9	(9)
2019–2024	Mallbackens IF	1	(3)
- * Club domestic league appearances and goals as of 20 August 2024

Irvina Bajramović (born 27 February 1995) is a Swedish footballer of Bosnian descent who plays as a forward for Mallbackens IF.

== Career ==
Irvina Bajramović was the top scorer when Gilleby/Stala Orust FC won Division 3 in the 2012 season. In the summer of 2013, she moved to Torslanda IK, where she did not get much playing time. Ahead of the 2014 season, she signed with Rössö, and she scored 34 goals in the 2015 season. After that season, Bajramovic chose to join the Damallsvenskan team Kopparbergs/Göteborg FC. In the agreement between her and the two clubs, it was written that Irvina played for both clubs. She started the match season at Rössö, but on 27 June 2016, she made her Damallsvenskan debut with a substitute appearance in the 88th minute against Linköpings FC; the match ended 1–0 to Linköping.

In 2017, Irvina played for Bosnia and Herzegovina women's national football team in a match against Croatia women's national football team.

In May 2018, Irvina Bajramović returned to the Division 1 club IK Rössö Uddevalla and remained until 2019. In 2019, she joined Mallbackens IF and currently plays as a forward.

== Personal life ==
Born in Sweden, Bajramović is of Bosnian descent.
