= Venera Rexhi =

Kosovan footballer (born 1996)

Personal information
- Date of birth: 19 February 1996 (age 30)
- Place of birth: Sundsvall, Sweden
- Position: Midfielder

Team information
- Current team: Mallbackens
- Number: 7

Youth career
- BK Zeros
- Borens IK

Senior career*
| Years | Team | Apps | (Gls) |
| 2013–2015 | Linköpings FC | 13 | (2) |
| 2016 | Växjö DFF | 19 | (4) |
| 2017 | Klepp IL | | |
| 2017 | Östersunds | 12 | (5) |
| 2018–2019 | Sundsvalls | 46 | (13) |
| 2020 | Mallbackens | 0 | (0) |
| 2021– | Mallbackens | 49 | (12) |

International career^{‡}
| 2023– | Kosovo | 3 | (0) |
- * Club domestic league appearances and goals as of 8 May 2024 ‡ National team caps and goals as of 8 May 2024

Venera Rexhi (born 19 February 1996) is a footballer who plays as a midfielder for Mallbackens. Born in Sweden, she plays for the Kosovo national team.

== Honours ==
Linköpings FC

Winner

- Svenska Cupen (2): 2013–14, 2014–15

Runner-up

- Svenska Supercupen: 2015, 2016
