= Simon Nilsson =

Swedish footballer

Personal information
- Full name: Per Åke Simon Nilsson
- Date of birth: 1 July 1992 (age 34)
- Place of birth: Norje, Sweden
- Height: 1.83 m (6 ft 0 in)
- Position: Right midfielder

Team information
- Current team: IK Tord
- Number: 7

Youth career
- –2002: Pukaviks IF
- 2002–2010: Mjällby AIF

Senior career*
Years	Team	Apps	(Gls)
2010–2015	Mjällby AIF	43	(1)
2014	→ Sölvesborgs GIF (loan)		
2016–2017	IFK Värnamo	52	(7)
2018–2020	Örgryte IS	41	(4)
2021	Assyriska IK	16	(2)
2022–	IK Tord	3	(0)
- * Club domestic league appearances and goals as of 21:58, 11 December 2022 (UTC)

Simon Nilsson (born 1 July 1992) is a Swedish footballer who plays as a right midfielder for IK Tord.
