= Richard Yarsuvat =

Swedish footballer

Personal information
- Full name: Richard Yarsuvat
- Date of birth: 24 May 1992 (age 34)
- Place of birth: Borås, Sweden
- Height: 1.74 m (5 ft 9 in)
- Position: Striker

Team information
- Current team: Norrby IF
- Number: 9

Youth career
- –2008: Borås AIK

Senior career*
Years	Team	Apps	(Gls)
2009	Borås AIK		
2010–2012	IF Elfsborg	5	(0)
2012	→ IFK Värnamo (loan)	6	(0)
2012	→ Örgryte IS (loan)	10	(4)
2013	Örgryte IS	21	(0)
2014–2015	Norrby IF	46	(32)
2016	Syrianska FC	0	(0)
2016	Norrby IF	24	(19)
2017	Dalkurd FF	27	(17)
2018–2019	Norrby IF	46	(16)
2020–2021	GAIS	41	(11)
2022–2024	Dalstorps IF	26	(13)
2024–	Norrby IF	19	(7)

International career
2011	Sweden U19	1	(0)
- * Club domestic league appearances and goals as of 9 May 2025

Richard Yarsuvat (born 24 May 1992) is a Swedish footballer who plays as a striker for Norrby IF.

== Career ==
He was the top scorer of 2017 Superettan for Dalkurd FF, but left the club after only one season following their promotion to the top tier.

== Personal life ==
Yarsuvat was born in Sweden to a Turkish father, and a Kosovan-Albanian mother.
