= Bjärsjölagård =

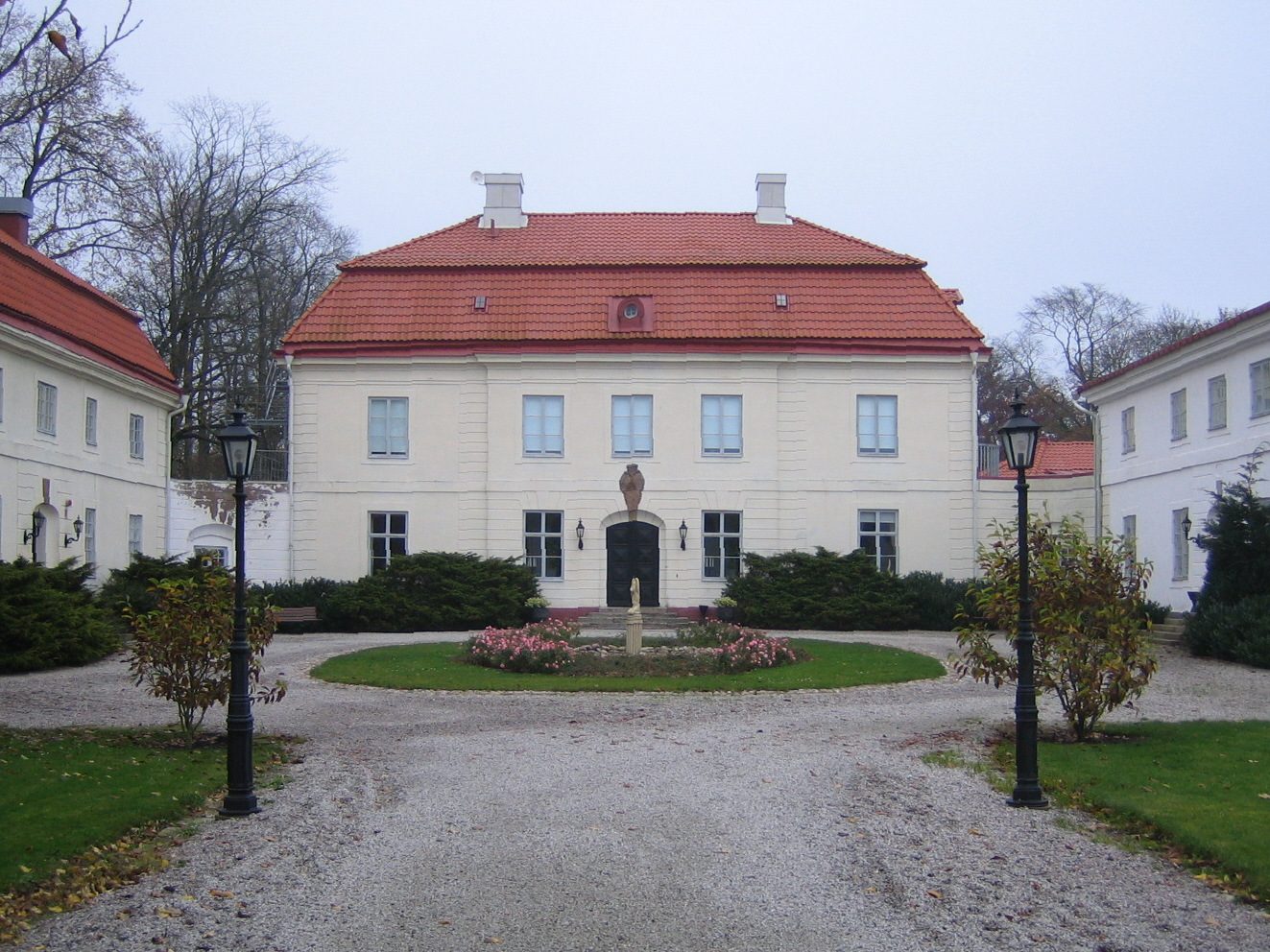
- Bjärsjölagård Castle

- Location within Skåne Location within Sweden
- Coordinates: 55°44′N 13°41′E
- Country: Sweden
- Province: Skåne
- County: Skåne County
- Municipality: Sjöbo Municipality

Area
  - Total: 0.52 km^{2} (0.20 sq mi)

Population (31 December 2010)
  - Total: 324
  - Density: 620/km^{2} (1,600/sq mi)
- Time zone: UTC+1 (CET)
  - Summer (DST): UTC+2 (CEST)

Bjärsjölagård (Swedish pronunciation: [bjærɧœˈlɑ̌ːɡɔɖ]) is a locality situated in Sjöbo Municipality, Skåne County, Sweden with 324 inhabitants in 2010.
