= Alexander Mellqvist =

Swedish footballer

Personal information
- Full name: Alexander Mellqvist
- Date of birth: 29 January 1986 (age 40)
- Place of birth: Sweden
- Height: 1.87 m (6 ft 2 in)
- Position: Defender

Team information
- Current team: Ljungskile SK
- Number: 15

Youth career
- Inlands IF

Senior career*
Years	Team	Apps	(Gls)
2005–2010	Örgryte IS	112	(15)
2011	Ljungskile SK	30	(7)
2012–2014	Varbergs BoIS	58	(11)
2015–	Ljungskile SK	62	(1)

International career
2001–2003	Sweden U17	14	(1)
2004–2005	Sweden U19	11	(1)
- * Club domestic league appearances and goals as of 30 November 2017

Alexander Mellqvist (born 28 January 1986) is a Swedish footballer who plays for Ljungskile SK as a defender.
