= Bjärsjölagård Castle =

Castle in Scania, Sweden

- Bjärsjölagård slott
- Sjöbo Municipality
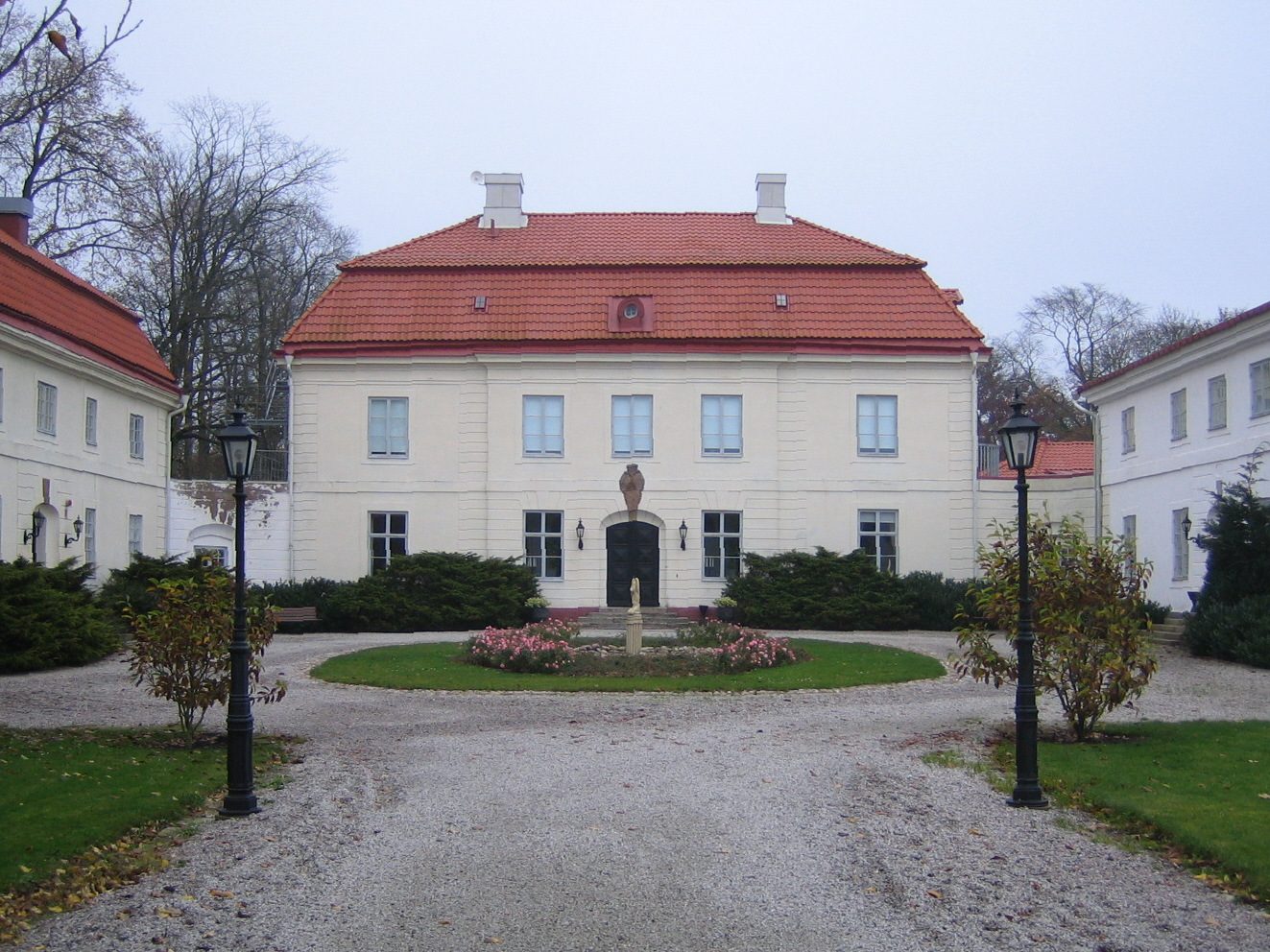
- Bjärsjölagård Castle

Site information
- Type: Castle
- Open to the public: By appointment only

Location
- Scania, Sweden
- Location within Skåne
- Coordinates: 55.726111°N 13.698889°E

Site history
- Built: 18th century

Bjärsjölagård Castle (Swedish: Bjärsjölagård slott) is a former mansion in Sjöbo Municipality, Scania, Sweden.

== History ==
The main building from 1766 and the north wing from 1777 are in Rococo architectural style. They were designed by architect Jean Eric Rehn (1717-1793). The south wing dates from 1812 and was designed in Empire style. Since 1958, the manor has functioned as a conference facility and has been a popular place for weddings and other gatherings.

== See also ==
- List of castles in Sweden
