= Andreas Wihlborg =

Swedish footballer

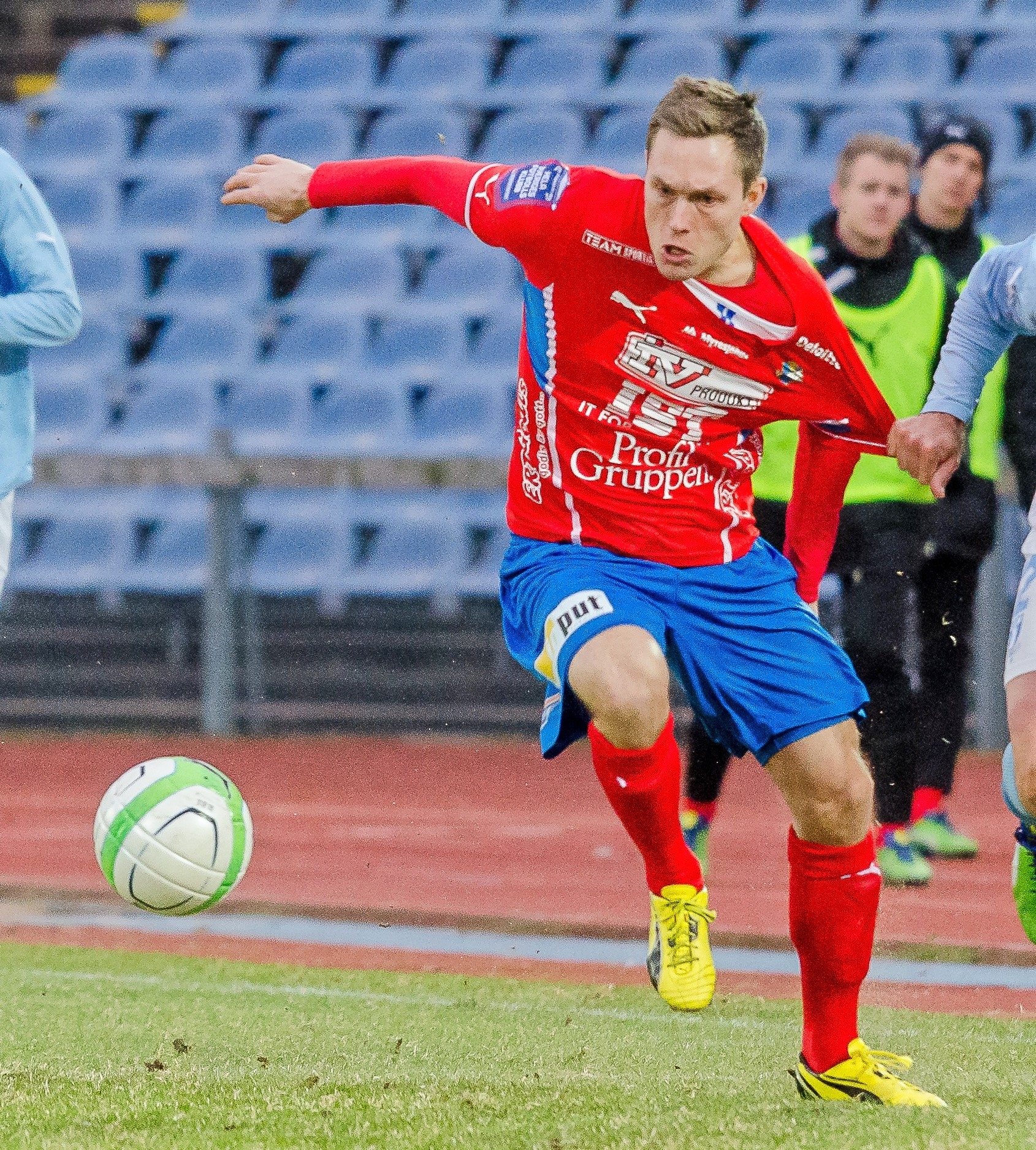

Personal information
- Date of birth: 18 January 1987 (age 39)
- Place of birth: Sweden
- Height: 1.75 m (5 ft 9 in)
- Position: Midfielder

Youth career
- Höllviken

Senior career*
Years	Team	Apps	(Gls)
2004–2006	Malmö	0	(0)
2006	→ Trelleborg (loan)	8	(0)
2007–2011	Trelleborg	68	(7)
2008–2009	→ Lyngby (loan)	20	(4)
2012–2015	Öster	59	(5)
2015–2016	Höllviken	31	(0)

International career
2007–2008	Sweden U21	4	(0)
- * Club domestic league appearances and goals

Andreas Wihlborg (born 18 January 1987) is a Swedish former footballer. He used to be a member of Sweden national under-21 football team.
