= Mallbackens IF =

- Full name: Mallbackens Idrottsförening
- Founded: 1942
- Ground: Strandvallen, Lysvik
- Capacity: 2,000
- Chairman: Sven Eriksson
- Coach: Filip Rinstad
- League: Elitettan
- 2024: 7th
- Website: https://www.laget.se/MallbackensIFdam
Home colours	Away colours

Mallbackens IF is a football club from Mallbacken, 15 kilometres north of Sunne in Värmland, Sweden. The club was established in 1942 and played in the Women's premier division (Damallsvenskan) for the first time in 1986. They currently play in Sweden's second division, the Elitettan.

The club play their home games at Strandvallen Stadium in Mallbacken. The team colours are green and white. The club is affiliated to the Värmlands Fotbollförbund.

== Current squad ==
As of 8 May 2024.

Note: Flags indicate national team as defined under FIFA eligibility rules; some limited exceptions apply. Players may hold more than one non-FIFA nationality.

No.	Pos.	Nation	Player
1	GK	SWE	Alexandra Blom
2	MF	SWE	Selma Berggen
3	MF	SWE	Zoé Sennelier
4	MF	SWE	Emina Trumic
5	DF	SWE	Frida Hedin
5	MF	SWE	Wilma Fernqvist
6	DF	SWE	Jessika Pedersen
6	MF	SWE	Elin Hedin
7	MF	KOS	Venera Rexhi
8	MF	SWE	Hilda Gahnsby Dahl (on loan from Växjö)
9	FW	GHA	Sharon Sampson
10	FW	SWE	Ida Hallstensson
11	FW	SWE	Viktoria Ström
12	MF	SWE	Emma Eriksson

No.	Pos.	Nation	Player
13	DF	SWE	Ebba Rehnberg
14	MF	SWE	Philippa Eriksson
15	FW	SWE	Irvina Bajramović
15	MF	SWE	Amanda Westlund
16	MF	SWE	Hannah Löfmark
17	DF	SWE	Susanne Skålberg
20	MF	SWE	Selma Gyllenvåg
20	FW	UGA	Ritah Kivumbi
21	GK	SWE	Malin Staum Eriksson
22	DF	SWE	Emma Tibell Häger
22	MF	SWE	Erika Stolpe
22	MF	SWE	Lovisa Rundqvist
23	MF	SWE	Andréa Staum Eriksson
