= Kevin Bisse =

Swedish footballer of Assyrian descent

Personal information
- Date of birth: 21 July 1995 (age 31)
- Place of birth: Södertälje, Sweden
- Height: 1.73 m (5 ft 8 in)
- Position: Midfielder

Youth career
- –2004: Syrianska FC
- 2005–2009: IF Brommapojkarna
- 2009–2012: Syrianska FC

Senior career*
Years	Team	Apps	(Gls)
2013–2017	Syrianska FC	57	(3)
2015	→ Karabükspor (loan)	0	(0)
2018	AFC Eskilstuna	0	(0)
2018	→ Syrianska FC (loan)	6	(0)
- * Club domestic league appearances and goals as of 20:31, 19 May 2019 (UTC)

Kevin Bisse (born 21 July 1995) is a Swedish footballer who plays as a midfielder.

== Career ==
Kevin Bisse started his football career with the Södertälje club Syrianska, but played five seasons in his youth with IF Brommapojkarna before going back to Syrianska in 2009.

He debuted in Allsvenskan during the 2013 season and played eleven games that year. He scored his first senior goal in Superettan on August 18, 2014.

In December 2014, Syrianska announced that Bisse had completed a move to Süper Lig club Karabükspor on loan for the remainder of the 2014–15 season. Karabükspor had an option to buy him out from Syrianska when the loan deal was over. Bisse suffered an injury in the beginning of 2015 and got transferred back to Syrianska without representing Karabükspor.

== Career statistics ==
=== Club ===
As of 27 October 2015

Club	Season	League			Cup		Continental		Total	
Club	Season	Division	Apps	Goals	Apps	Goals	Apps	Goals	Apps	Goals
Syrianska FC	2012	Allsvenskan	0	0	1	0	—		1	0
Syrianska FC	2013	Allsvenskan	10	0	3	0	—		13	0
Syrianska FC	2014	Superettan	20	1	4	1	—		24	2
Syrianska FC	2015	Superettan	8	1	0	0	—		8	1
Syrianska FC	2016	Superettan	0	0	0	0	—		0	0
Syrianska FC	Total		38	2	8	1	0	0	46	3
Career total			38	2	8	1	0	0	46	3
