= Elmin Kurbegović =

Swedish footballer

Personal information
- Date of birth: 3 June 1987 (age 39)
- Place of birth: Kotor Varoš, SFR Yugoslavia
- Height: 1.87 m (6 ft 2 in)
- Position: Midfielder

Team information
- Current team: IFK Värnamo
- Number: 12

Youth career
- Elfsborg

Senior career*
Years	Team	Apps	(Gls)
2008–2011	Elfsborg	16	(0)
2009–2010	→ Novara (loan)	3	(0)
2012–	Värnamo	14	(2)

International career
2007–2009	Sweden U21	3	(0)
- * Club domestic league appearances and goals as of 09:18, 20 January 2012 (UTC)

Elmin Kurbegović (born 3 June 1987) is a Swedish footballer of Bosnian descent, who currently plays for IFK Värnamo.

== Career ==
Kurbegović was born in Kotor Varoš in Bosnia and Herzegovina. After the war broke out he left for Sweden and started his career at Elfsborg in 2006. He left Elfsborg after the 2011 season, having not been offered a new contract by the club.

After just having played once in 2009 Allsvenskan he left for Novara on loan.

He was called up to play internationally for Sweden U21 in a friendly match. He's still eligible to represent both Sweden and Bosnia and Herzegovina at the senior level.
