= Eneby BK =

Swedish football club

- Full name: Eneby Bollklubb
- Short name: EBK
- Founded: 1919
- Ground: MAXIvallen Wembley; Norrköping; Sweden
- Capacity: 2000–3000
- Chairman: Gary Dambergs
- Head coach: Siw Einstulen, Joakim Sundgren
- League: Division 4 Östergötland östra
- 2025: 3th
Home colours

Eneby BK is a Swedish football club located in Norrköping. (The article refers to men's teams.)

== Background ==
Eneby BK currently plays in Division 4 Östergötland östra, which is the sixth tier of Swedish football. They play their home matches at the Maxivallen in Norrköping.

Eneby BK are affiliated to Östergötlands Fotbollförbund. Eneby BK played in the 2006 Svenska Cupen but lost 1–5 at home to Enskede IK in the first round.

== Season to season ==
Season	Level	Division	Section	Position	Movements
1999	Tier 5	Division 4	Östergötland Östra	3rd	
2000	Tier 5	Division 4	Östergötland Östra	6th	
2001	Tier 5	Division 4	Östergötland Östra	5th	
2002	Tier 5	Division 4	Östergötland Östra	1st	Promoted
2003	Tier 4	Division 3	Nordöstra Götaland	9th	Relegation Playoffs – Relegated
2004	Tier 5	Division 4	Östergötland Östra	1st	Promoted
2005	Tier 4	Division 3	Västra Svealand	12th	Relegated
2006*	Tier 6	Division 4	Östergötland Östra	3rd	
2007	Tier 6	Division 4	Östergötland Östra	5th	
2008	Tier 6	Division 4	Östergötland Östra	7th	
2009	Tier 6	Division 4	Östergötland Östra	5th	
2010	Tier 6	Division 4	Östergötland Östra	5th	
2011	Tier 6	Division 4	Östergötland Östra	5th	
2012	Tier 6	Division 4	Östergötland Östra	6th	
2013	Tier 6	Division 4	Östergötland Östra	2nd	Promotion Playoffs - Not Promoted
2014	Tier 6	Division 4	Östergötland Östra	2nd	Promotion Playoffs - Not Promoted
2015	Tier 6	Division 4	Östergötland Östra	3rd	
2016	Tier 6	Division 4	Östergötland Östra	1st	Promoted
2017	Tier 5	Division 3	Nordöstra Götaland	4th	
2018	Tier 5	Division 3	Nordöstra Götaland	6th	
2019	Tier 5	Division 3	Nordöstra Götaland	5th	
2020	Tier 5	Division 3	Nordöstra Götaland	7th	
2021	Tier 5	Division 3	Nordöstra Götaland	2nd	
2022	Tier 5	Division 3	Nordöstra Götaland	4th	
2023	Tier 5	Division 3	Nordöstra Götaland	6th	
2024	Tier 5	Division 3	Mellersta Svealand	12nd	relegated
2025	Tier 6	Division 4	Östergötland östra	3rd	

* League restructuring in 2006 resulted in a new division being created at Tier 3 and subsequent divisions dropping a level.

== Attendances ==
In recent seasons Eneby BK have had the following average attendances:

Season	Average attendance	Division / Section	Level
2017	115	Div 3 Nordöstra Götaland	Tier 5
2018	108	Div 3 Nordöstra Götaland	Tier 5
2019	?	Div 3 Nordöstra Götaland	Tier 5
2020		Div 3 Nordöstra Götaland	Tier 5

* Attendances are provided in the Publikliga sections of the Svenska Fotbollförbundet website.
