= Olofstorp =

- Location within Västra Götaland Location within Sweden
- Coordinates: 57°48′N 12°09′E
- Country: Sweden
- Province: Västergötland
- County: Västra Götaland County
- Municipality: Göteborg Municipality

Area
  - Total: 2.51 km^{2} (0.97 sq mi)

Population (31 December 2010)
  - Total: 3,378
  - Density: 1,343/km^{2} (3,480/sq mi)
- Time zone: UTC+1 (CET)
  - Summer (DST): UTC+2 (CEST)

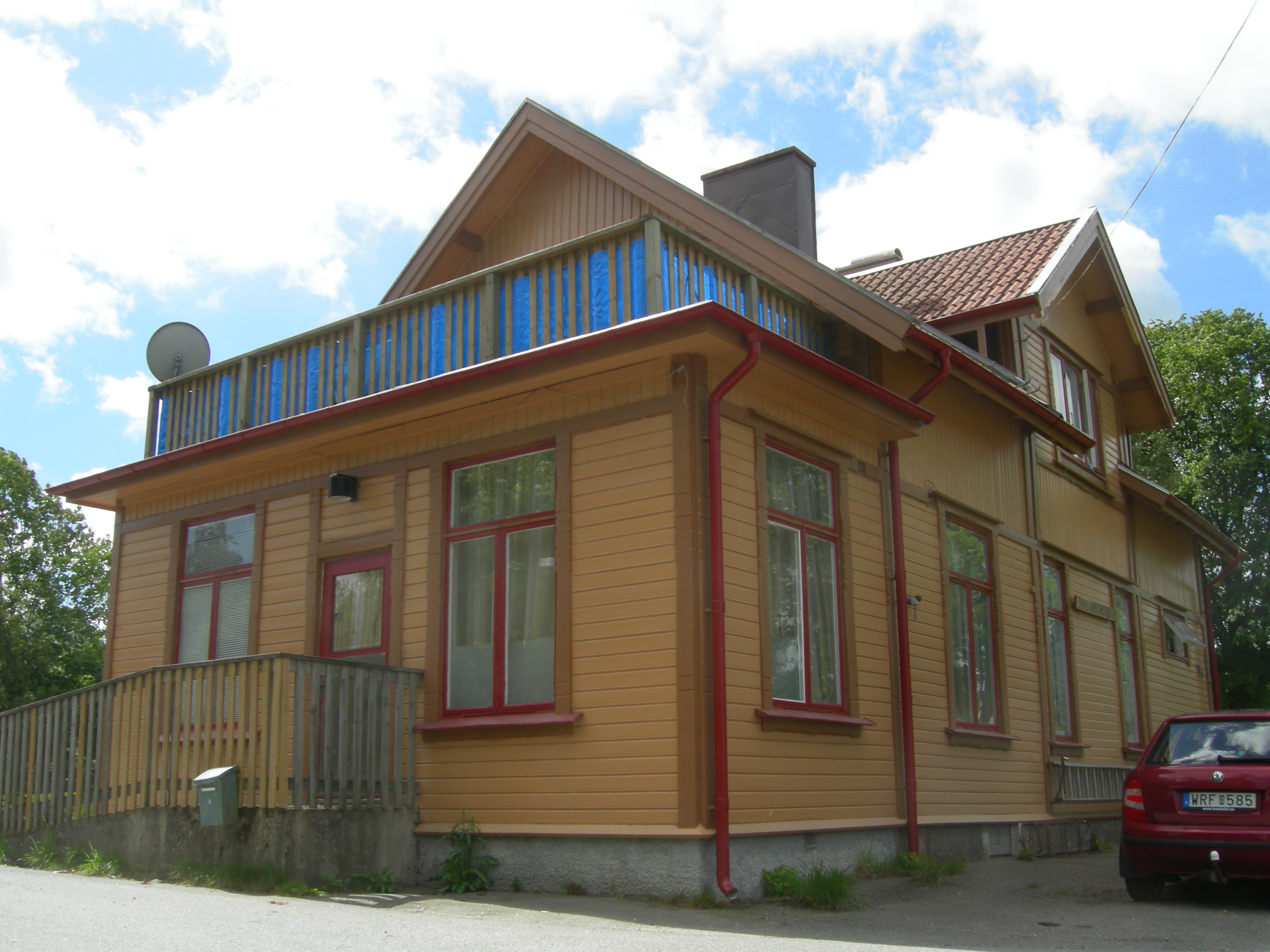

Olofstorp is a locality situated in Gothenburg Municipality, Västra Götaland County, Sweden. It has 4,142 inhabitants (2020). There is an annual event held at the local farmyard, this event is called Bergumsdagen ("Bergum Day"). There is currently one school in Olofstorp: Bergumsskolan. Olofstorp has three restaurants, a kiosk, a 24-hour gym, and a flower shop. Lake Älsjön is located there and is a popular swimming site for inhabitants, there is a float with high diving boards

== Notable former residents ==
Lotta Engberg, Swedish singer and television host.
