= Ritah Namayanja Kivumbi =

Ugandan visual artist (born 1980)

Ritah Namayanja Kivumba
- Born: May 1, 1980 (age 46); Uganda
- Other name: Ritah Wise
- Education: Makerere University
- Organization(s): Art director; founder of Magezi Arts Exhibition Centre
- Known for: Arts administrator, motivational speaker
- Awards: Presidential Golden Medal (2016) by president Museveni for Empowering Youth and Women

Ritah Namayanja Kivumbi (born May 1, 1980), is a Ugandan blind art director, arts administrator, and motivational speaker. She is the founder and art director of Magezi Arts Exhibition Centre currently located at the Namirembe Guest House in Kampala. In 2016, Namayanja was awarded the presidential golden medal by President Museveni recognizing her efforts in empowering youths and women. She is also known as Ritah Wise.

== Early life and education ==
Namayanja attended Uganda Martyrs Senior School Namugongo (O-level) and Uganda Martyrs High School, Rubaga (A-level).

She joined Makerere University where she graduated with a Bachelor's degree in Development Studies and later on attained a Master's degree in Ethics and Public Management.

== Career ==
Before Namayanja went blind, she was the administrator of the Makerere University Art Gallery and she organized the Magezi Art Exhibition in September 2008.

In 2008, shortly before Namayinja went blind, she founded the Magezi Arts Gallery. In November 2008, Namayanja developed frequent severe headaches and she became blind a month later, which led to her falling into depression and self-pity for seven years.

In March 2015, she revived the Magezi arts gallery, which deals in various visual artworks and also trains students from various tertiary institutions. In 2016, on International Women's Day, Namayanja was awarded the Presidential Golden Medal by President Museveni recognizing her efforts in empowering youths and women.
