= Huddinge IF =

Swedish football club

- Full name: Huddinge Idrottsförening
- Founded: 1912
- Ground: Källbrinks IP
- Capacity: 2 500
- Chairman: Fredrik Lange
- Manager: Stefan Lindblom
- League: Division 2 Södra Svealand
- 2024: Division 2 Södra Svealand, 7th of 14
- Website: huddingeif.se
Home colours

Huddinge IF is a Swedish football club located in Huddinge, a municipality in Stockholm County in east central Sweden.

== Background ==
Huddinge Idrottsförening is the oldest sports club in the municipality. Inspired by the 1912 Summer Olympics in Stockholm, Otto Hellkvist founded the club the same year. For several decades, the club had many sections, including bandy, table tennis, cycling, athletics, and skiing. Today, Huddinge IF is purely a football club and is one of the largest in Stockholm with about 1,200 active members and 70 teams. Successful clubs in Huddinge that originated as sections within Huddinge IF before breaking away from the parent club include Huddinge IK (ice hockey) and Huddinge BT (table tennis).

Since their founding Huddinge IF has participated mainly in the middle and lower divisions of the Swedish football league system. The club currently plays in Division 2 Södra Svealand which is the fourth tier of Swedish football. They play their home matches at Källbrinks IP in Huddinge.

At best, they have played in the third tier, 1970 (when it was called division 3), 1989 and 1996 (when it was called division 2), and 2014-15 (when it was called division 1).

The ladies team of the club played three seasons, 1998–2000, in the second tier, when it was called division 1 (present day Elitettan). In 2024, they are in the fourth tier, division 2, after promotion from division 3 in 2023.

Huddinge IF are affiliated to the Stockholms Fotbollförbund.

== Recent history ==
In recent seasons Huddinge IF have competed in the following divisions:

- 2025 – Division II, Södra svealand
- 2024 - Svenska Cupen, beaten by Gefle IF in round 2
- 2024 – Division II, Södra svealand
- 2023 - Svenska Cupen, beaten by Dalkurd FF in round 1
- 2023 – Division II, Södra svealand
- 2022 - Svenska Cupen, beaten by Degerfors IF in round 2
- 2022 – Division II, Södra svealand
- 2021 – Division II, Södra svealand
- 2020 – Division II, Södra svealand
- 2019 – Division II, Södra svealand
- 2018 – Division II, Södra svealand
- 2017 – Division II, Södra svealand
- 2016 – Division II, Södra svealand
- 2015 – Division I, Norra (Placed 12th out of 14 and faced relegation)
- 2015 – Svenska Cupen, group stage, group 5
- 2014 – Division I, Norra
- 2013 – Division II, Norra Svealand (Won the league and was promoted to Division I)
- 2012 – Division III, Södra Svealand (Won the league and was promoted to Division II)
- 2011 – Division III, Södra Svealand
- 2010 – Division III, Östra Svealand
- 2009 – Division III, Södra Svealand
- 2008 – Division III, Södra Svealand (Placed 2nd and played qualifying games for Division II)
- 2007 – Division III, Östra Svealand (Placed 2nd and played qualifying games for Division II)
- 2006 – Division III, Östra Svealand (Placed 2nd and played qualifying games for Division II)
- 2005 – Division IV, Stockholm Södra
- 2004 – Division III, Östra Svealand
- 2003 – Division III, Östra Svealand
- 2002 – Division III, Östra Svealand
- 2001 – Division III, Östra Svealand
- 2000 – Division III, Östra Svealand
- 1999 – Division IV, Stockholm Södra
- 1998 – Division III, Östra Svealand
- 1997 – Division III, Östra Svealand
- 1996 – Division II, Östra Svealand
- 1995 – Division III, Östra Svealand
- 1994 – Division III, Östra Svealand
- 1993 – Division III, Östra Svealand

== About seasons 2014 and 2015 ==
The 2014 season in division 1 was a success. The season got off to a good start, had a decline in the middle and finally started improving towards the end. In the last knockout stage of the 2014-15 Svenska Cupen the team shocked Åtvidabergs FF, playing in Allsvenskan, with a victory that ended 2–2 at full time and 7–6 after a penalty shooutout. This victory meant that Huddinge IF had reached the reached the group stage of Svenska Cupen.

The 2015 season started with the group stage of Svenska Cupen, facing BK Häcken (Allsvenskan), Mjällby AIF (Superettan) and Östers IF (Division 1 södra). The home games were played at Skytteholms IP in Solna, located on the other side of town. The results were probably about as expected. Mjällby at home 0–4, Häcken at home 1–3, and Öster away, 0–3. The goal against Häcken was scored by Patrick Amoah.

After a miserable start to the 2015 league season, Huddinge shaped up towards the end and had the chance to remain in division 1 in their last game, facing league-winning Dalkurd FF at home. They won the game 2–1, giving Dalkurd their only loss that season, but were still relegated. Had the game been won with at least two goals, they would have remained in division 1.
