= Ritah Kivumbi =

Ugandan footballer (born 1995)

Personal information
- Date of birth: 21 June 1995 (age 31)
- Place of birth: Uganda
- Position: Striker

Team information
- Current team: Mallbackens IF

Senior career*
Years	Team	Apps	(Gls)
2016–2019	Växjö DFF	81	(29)
2020–	Mallbackens IF	64	(19)

International career
- Uganda
- * Club domestic league appearances and goals

Ritah Kivumbi (born 21 June 1995) is an Ugandan footballer who plays as a striker for Mallbackens IF.

== Early life ==
Kivumbi started playing football at a young age with boys.

== Education ==
Kivumbi attended St Mary's Boarding Senior Secondary School Kitende.

== Club career ==
Before the 2016 season, Kivumbi signed for Swedish side Växjö DFF, where she was regarded as one of the club's most important players. She formed an attacking partnership with Swedish striker Anna Anvegård. Despite this, there was initial uncertainty regarding whether she would be allowed to live in Sweden. Before the 2020 season, she signed for Swedish side Mallbackens IF. She has been regarded as one of the club's most important players.

== International career ==
Kivumbi has been regarded to have struggled to be available even when called up to the Uganda women's national football team. Despite this, she represented Uganda internationally at the 2022 Women's Africa Cup of Nations.

== Style of play ==
Kivumbi mainly operates as a striker and is known for her speed.

== Personal life ==
Kivumbi has regarded Brazil international Ronaldinho as her football idol.
