= Per Frick =

Swedish footballer

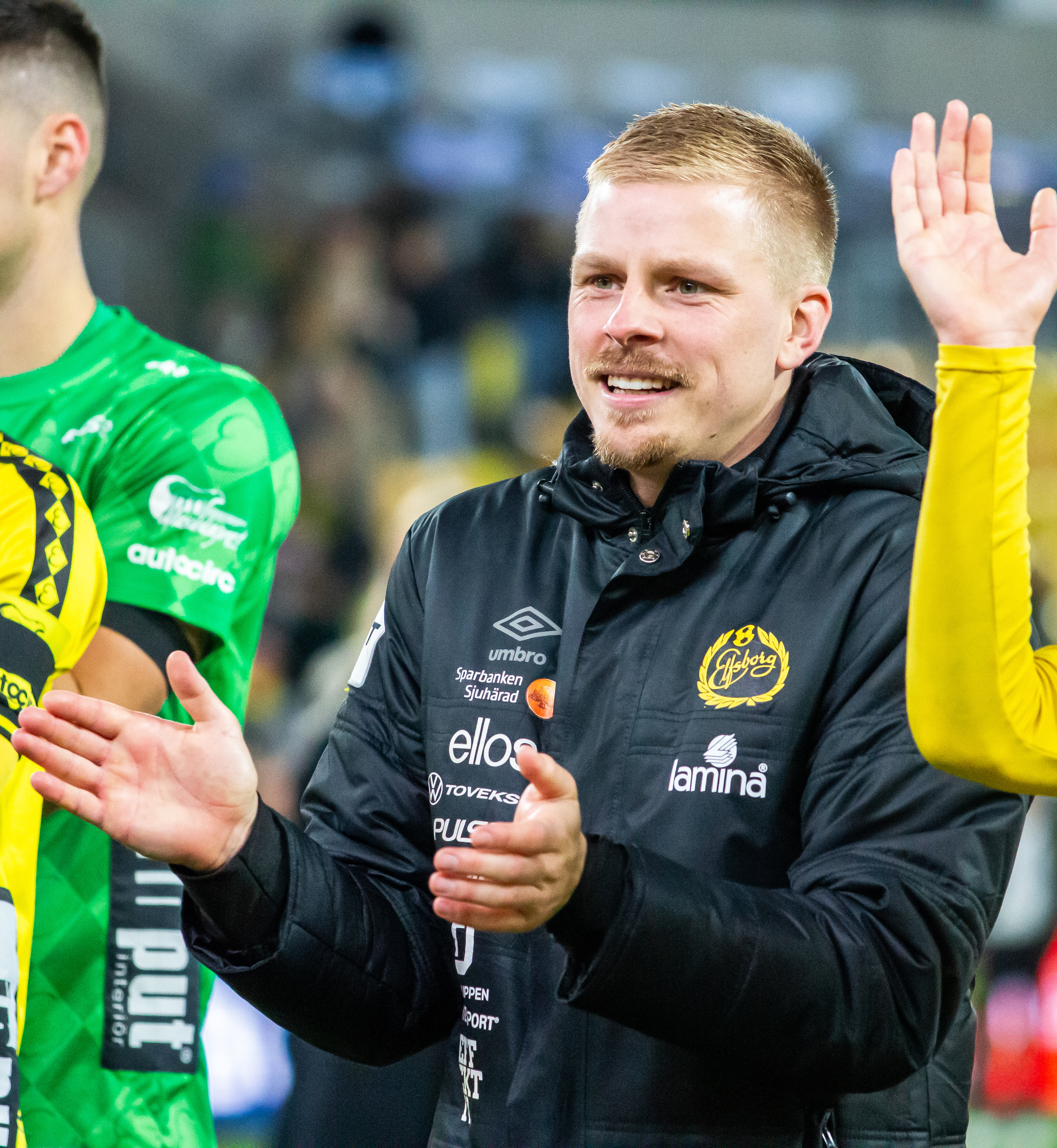

Personal information
- Full name: Per Samuel Frick
- Date of birth: 14 April 1992 (age 34)
- Place of birth: Kil, Sweden
- Height: 1.82 m (6 ft 0 in)
- Position: Striker

Team information
- Current team: IF Elfsborg
- Number: 17

Youth career
- Kils AIK
- 2004–2007: FBK Karlstad

Senior career*
Years	Team	Apps	(Gls)
2007–2009	FBK Karlstad	29	(12)
2009–	IF Elfsborg	267	(59)
2013	→ Falkenbergs FF (loan)	15	(7)

International career^{‡}
2007–2009	Sweden U17	10	(4)
2014	Sweden U21	1	(0)
2017	Sweden	2	(1)
- * Club domestic league appearances and goals as of 8 July 2026 ‡ National team caps and goals as of 12 January 2017

Per Samuel Frick (born 14 April 1992) is a Swedish professional footballer who plays as a striker for IF Elfsborg in Allsvenskan. He has won two caps for the Sweden national team, scoring one goal. He is one of the co-founders of the Swedish clothing brand Ciszere.

== Career statistics ==
=== International ===
Appearances and goals by national team and year
National team	Year	Apps	Goals
Sweden	2017	2	1
Total		2	1

International goals

Scores and results list Sweden's goal tally first.

#	Date	Venue	Opponent	Score	Result	Competition
1.	12 January 2017	Armed Forces Stadium, Abu Dhabi, UAE	Slovakia	5–0	6–0	Friendly

== Honours ==
IF Elfsborg

- Allsvenskan: 2012
