= BW 90 IF =

- Full name: Bjärsjölagård Wollsjö 90 Idrottsförening
- Founded: 1990
- Dissolved: 2017
- Ground: Bjärsjölagårds IP; Bjärsjölagård; Sweden
Home colours

BW 90 IF was a Swedish football club located in Bjärsjölagård in Sjöbo Municipality, Skåne County.

== Background ==
BW 90 Idrottsförening were formed in 1990 following the merger of Bjärsjölagårds IF and Wollsjö IF. After several years of cooperation Wollsjö chose to go their own way and BW 90 thus became synonymous with the old Bjärsjölagård IF. The club however chose to keep the BW 90 title as it is a well established name among other football clubs.

Since their foundation BW 90 IF participated mainly in the middle and lower divisions of the Swedish football league system. They played their home matches at their own sports field, Bjärsjölagårds IP, which is in the middle of Bjärsjölagård.

BW 90 IF were affiliated to Skånes Fotbollförbund.

The club was dissolved due to bankruptcy in 2017.

== Recent history ==
In recent seasons BW 90 IF have competed in the following divisions:

2013 – Division 2 södra Götaland
2012 – Division 3 södra Götaland
2011 – Division 3 södra Götaland
2010 – Division 4 Skåne östra
2009 – Division 4 Skåne södra
2008 – Division 4 Skåne södra
2007 – Division 4 Skåne mellersta
2006 – Division 5 Skåne sydöstra
2005 – Division 5 Skåne sydöstra
2004 – Division 5 Skåne östra
2003 – Division 5 Skåne sydöstra
2002 – Division 5 Skåne Östra
2001 – Division 5 Skåne Östra
2000 – Division 5 Skåne Östra
1999 – Division 5 Skåne Östra

== Attendances ==
In recent seasons BW 90 IF have had the following average attendances:

Season	Average attendance	– Division / Section	Level
2009	Not available	Div 4 Skåne södra	Tier 6
2010	113	Div 4 Skåne östra	Tier 6

* Attendances are provided in the Publikliga sections of the Svenska Fotbollförbundet website.
