= 2025 Superettan =

Superettan
- Season: 2025
- Dates: 29 March 2025 – 8 November 2025
- Champions: Västerås SK (2nd title)
- Promoted: Västerås SK; Kalmar FF; Örgryte IS
- Relegated: Utsiktens BK; Trelleborgs FF; Umeå FC
- Matches: 240
- Goals: 686 (2.86 per match)
- Top goalscorer: Amar Muhsin (21 goals)
- Biggest home win: Örgryte 6–0 Östersund (27 July 2025)
- Biggest away win: Östersund 1–6 Västerås (4 October 2025)
- Highest scoring: Brage 4–5 Örebro (20 September 2025)
- Longest winning run: Västerås (8)
- Longest unbeaten run: Kalmar (16)
- Longest winless run: Örebro (21)
- Longest losing run: Umeå; Brage (6)
- Highest attendance: 9,512; Örebro 0–2 Västerås SK (1 April 2025)
- Lowest attendance: 130; Utsikten 2–1 Brage (29 September 2025)
- Total attendance: 68,346
- Average attendance: 3,597
- All statistics correct as of 8 November 2025.

The 2025 Superettan is the 26th season of Superettan, Sweden's second-tier football division in its current format. It is part of the 2025 Swedish football season and contested by 16 teams. The season will kick off on 29 March and will conclude on 8 November. The summer break will take place between 30 June–18 July.

== Teams ==
A total of 16 teams contest the league. The top two teams qualify directly for promotion to Allsvenskan, the third will enter a play-off for the chance of promotion. The two bottom teams are automatically relegated, while the 13th and 14th placed teams will compete in a play-off to determine whether they are relegated.

The following teams have changed division since the 2024 season:

=== To Superettan ===
Promoted from Ettan

- Umeå FC – Winner Ettan Norra
- Falkenbergs FF – Winner Ettan Södra

Relegated from Allsvenskan

- Kalmar FF
- Västerås SK

=== From Superettan ===
Promoted to Allsvenskan

- Degerfors IF
- Östers IF

Relegated to Ettan

- Gefle IF
- Skövde AIK

=== Stadia and locations ===
Locations of the 2025 Superettan teams

Team	Location	Stadium	Stadium capacity
Falkenbergs FF	Falkenberg	Falcon Alkoholfri Arena	5,500
GIF Sundsvall	Sundsvall	NP3 Arena	8,000
Helsingborgs IF	Helsingborg	Olympia	16,000
IK Brage	Borlänge	Borlänge Energi Arena	6,500
IK Oddevold	Uddevalla	Rimnersvallen	4,000
Kalmar FF	Kalmar	Guldfågeln Arena	12,150
Landskrona BoIS	Landskrona	Landskrona IP	10,000
Sandvikens IF	Sandviken	Jernvallen	7,000
Västerås SK	Västerås	Hitachi Energy Arena	8,900
Trelleborgs FF	Trelleborg	Vångavallen	7,357
Umeå FC	Umeå	Gammliavallen	10,000
Utsiktens BK	Gothenburg	Bravida Arena	6,316
Varbergs BoIS	Varberg	Påskbergsvallen	4,575
Örebro SK	Örebro	Behrn Arena	13,072
Örgryte IS	Gothenburg	Gamla Ullevi	18,454
Östersunds FK	Östersund	Jämtkraft Arena	8,466

=== Personnel and kits ===
Note: Flags indicate national team as has been defined under FIFA eligibility rules. Players and Managers may hold more than one non-FIFA nationality.

Team	Head coach	Captain	Kit manufacturer	Sponsors	
Team	Head coach	Captain	Kit manufacturer	Main	Other(s)
Falkenbergs FF	(Sweden) Christoffer Andersson	(Sweden) Tim Stålheden	(Germany) Adidas		List: Front: Back: Sleeves: Shorts: Socks:
GIF Sundsvall	(Finland) Erol Ates	(Sweden) Pontus Engblom	(Germany) Puma		List: Front: Back: Sleeves: Shorts: Socks:
Helsingborgs IF	(Sweden) Klebér Saarenpää	(Sweden) Wilhelm Nilsson	(Germany) Puma	(Sweden) Vobbiz	List: Front: Back: Sleeves:XXL; Shorts: Socks:
IK Brage	(Sweden) Janne Mian (Sweden) William Bergendahl	(Sweden) Alexander Zetterström	(Denmark) Select		List: Front: Back: Sleeves: Shorts: Socks:
IK Oddevold	(Sweden) Rikard Nilsson	(Sweden) Alexander Almqvist	(Germany) Puma		List: Front: Back: Sleeves: Shorts: Socks:
Kalmar FF	(Finland) Toni Koskela	(Sweden) Melker Hallberg	(Denmark) Select	(Sweden) Mjlti Bygg	List: Front: Mjlti Bygg; Back: Redeye; Sleeves: Unibet; Shorts: Cupra; Socks:
Landskrona BoIS	(Sweden) Robin Asterhed	(Sweden) Melker Jonsson	(United States) Nike	(Sweden) Ohlssons	List: Front: Ohlssons; Back: Puls; Sleeves: Shorts: Socks:
Sandvikens IF	(Sweden) Eldar Abdulic	(Sweden) Gustav Thörn	(Germany) Adidas		List: Front: Back: Sleeves: Shorts: Socks:
Trelleborgs FF	(Sweden) Stefan Jacobsson	(Sweden) Charlie Weberg	(Sweden) Craft		List: Front: Back: Sleeves: Shorts: Socks:
Umeå FC	(Sweden) Anders Bååth	(Sweden) Stefan Lindmark	(Germany) Adidas		List: Front: Back: Sleeves: Shorts: Socks:
Utsiktens BK	(Sweden) Bosko Orovic	(Sweden) Malkolm Moënza	(Denmark) Select		List: Front: Back: Sleeves: Shorts: Socks:
Varbergs BoIS	(Sweden) Roar Hansen	(Sweden) Gustav Broman	(Sweden) Craft		List: Front: Back: Sleeves: Shorts: Socks:
Västerås SK	(Sweden) Kalle Karlsson	(Burundi) Frédéric Nsabiyumva	(Germany) Puma		List: Front: Back: Sleeves: Shorts: Socks:
Örebro SK	(Sweden) Christian Järdler	(Sweden) Kalle Holmberg	(Denmark) Select		List: Front: Back: Sleeves: Shorts: Socks:
Örgryte IS	(Sweden) Andreas Holmberg	(Sweden) Daniel Paulson	(England) Umbro		List: Front: NTex; Back: Sleeves: Shorts: Socks:
Östersunds FK	(Sweden) Kiarash Livani	(Sweden) Ali Suljić	(Germany) Adidas		List: Front: Back: Sleeves: Shorts: Socks:

=== Managerial Changes ===
Managerial changes
Club	Outgoing manager	Reason for leaving	Leaving date	League position	Successor	Appointment date
Örebro	(Sweden) Christian Järdler	Sacked	28 November 2024	Before season	(Serbia) Sreten Kenic	4 December 2024
Östersund	(Sweden) Thomas Gabrielsson	Contract expired	4 December 2024	—	(Sweden) Kiarash Livani	9 December 2024
Kalmar	(Sweden) Stefan Larsson	End of interim spell	20 December 2024	—	(Finland) Toni Koskela	20 December 2024

== League table ==
Pos	Team	Pld	W	D	L	GF	GA	GD	Pts	Promotion, qualification or relegation
1	Västerås SK (C, P)	30	20	5	5	62	30	+32	65	Promotion to Allsvenskan
2	Kalmar FF (P)	30	18	10	2	52	21	+31	64	Promotion to Allsvenskan
3	Örgryte IS (O, P)	30	16	8	6	57	33	+24	56	Qualification for the Allsvenskan play-off
4	IK Oddevold	30	13	9	8	42	36	+6	48	
5	Falkenbergs FF	30	12	10	8	53	36	+17	46	
6	Varbergs BoIS	30	11	10	9	45	42	+3	43	
7	Helsingborgs IF	30	11	8	11	42	39	+3	41	
8	IK Brage	30	11	8	11	51	51	0	41	
9	Landskrona BoIS	30	11	8	11	39	47	−8	41	
10	Sandvikens IF	30	12	5	13	36	47	−11	41	
11	GIF Sundsvall	30	11	7	12	36	38	−2	40	
12	Östersunds FK	30	9	9	12	33	51	−18	36	
13	Utsiktens BK (R)	30	7	9	14	46	53	−7	30	Qualification for the Superettan play-off
14	Örebro SK (O)	30	4	10	16	39	54	−15	22	Qualification for the Superettan play-off
15	Trelleborgs FF (R)	30	5	7	18	23	51	−28	22	Relegation to Ettan
16	Umeå FC (R)	30	4	7	19	30	57	−27	19	Relegation to Ettan

Source: svenskfotboll.se
Rules for classification: 1) Points; 2) Goal difference; 3) Number of goals scored; 4) Head-to-head points; 5) Head-to-head goal difference; 6) Head-to-head away goals scored
(C) Champions; (O) Play-off winners; (P) Promoted; (R) Relegated

=== Superettan play-off ===
The thirteenth and fourteenth-placed teams from Superettan will face one of the two runners-up from the 2025 Ettan in two-legged ties for the final two places in the 2026 Superettan.

20 November 2025
19:00

Norrby IF	3–2	Utsiktens BK
Andersson 29'; Dahl 65'; Chika Chidi 77'	Report	Sise 40'; Titi 58'

Borås Arena, Borås
Attendance: 1,696
Referee: Farouk Nehdi
23 November 2025
13:00

Utsiktens BK	1–1	Norrby IF
Johansson 86'	Report	Krasnici 62'

Bravida Arena, Gothenburg
Attendance: 926
Referee: Adi Aganović

Norrby IF won 4–3 on aggregate.

20 November 2025
19:00

Hammarby TFF	1–0	Örebro SK
Adindu 29'	Report

Hammarby IP, Stockholm
Attendance: 2,013
Referee: Erik Mattsson
23 November 2025
15:00

Örebro SK	2–1 (a.e.t.)	Hammarby TFF
Holmberg 31'; Stenberg 115'	Report	Lahdo 91'
Penalties
Holmberg (penalty scored); Bajrović (penalty scored); Baffoe (penalty scored); Stenberg (penalty scored); Andersson (penalty scored)	5–3	(penalty scored) Marrah; (penalty scored) Laturnus; (penalty scored) Simpson; (penalty missed) Öberg

Eyravallen, Örebro
Attendance: 10,512
Referee: Victor Wolf

2–2 on aggregate; Örebro SK won 5–3 on penalties.

== Positions by round ==
Team ╲ Round	1	2	3	4	5	6	7	8	9	10	11	12	13	14	15	16	17	18	19	20	21	22	23	24	25	26	27	28	29	30
Västerås SK	2	3	3	6	7	7	6	7	6	5	4	5	7	5	3	3	3	3	3	3	3	3	3	3	3	3	2	2	2	1
Kalmar FF	10	8	1	1	1	2	1	1	1	1	1	1	1	1	2	2	2	2	2	1	2	2	2	2	2	2	1	1	1	2
Örgryte IS	3	6	8	4	4	4	5	5	4	5	2	3	2	3	1	1	1	1	1	2	1	1	1	1	1	1	3	3	3	3
IK Oddevold	4	1	4	5	5	6	4	4	3	4	6	4	3	2	4	5	5	4	5	4	4	4	4	4	4	4	4	4	4	4
Falkenbergs FF	8	2	9	9	6	9	9	10	7	6	7	7	9	9	10	9	7	9	10	7	9	7	6	6	6	6	5	5	5	5
Varbergs BoIS	7	4	7	2	2	1	2	2	2	2	3	2	4	4	5	4	4	6	6	6	5	5	5	5	5	5	6	6	6	6
Helsingborgs IF	15	14	11	8	11	12	10	11	13	12	13	13	12	10	8	10	9	7	9	10	10	11	11	10	8	9	8	9	9	7
IK Brage	6	12	13	11	9	10	12	13	10	10	11	11	10	13	12	12	11	10	8	8	6	9	8	9	10	10	10	10	10	8
Landskrona BoIS	9	11	5	4	3	3	3	3	5	7	5	6	5	8	9	8	10	8	7	9	8	6	7	8	9	8	9	7	7	9
Sandvikens IF	11	7	2	7	10	11	8	9	11	13	10	9	8	6	7	7	8	11	11	11	11	10	10	11	11	11	12	11	11	10
GIF Sundsvall	1	9	10	12	12	8	11	8	9	9	9	8	6	7	6	6	6	5	4	5	7	8	9	7	7	7	7	8	8	11
Östersunds FK	5	5	6	10	8	5	7	6	8	8	8	10	13	12	11	11	12	12	13	12	12	12	12	12	12	12	11	12	12	12
Utsiktens BK	12	15	15	13	13	13	13	12	12	11	12	12	11	11	13	13	13	13	12	13	13	13	13	13	13	13	13	13	13	13
Örebro SK	16	16	16	16	16	16	16	15	15	15	15	15	15	15	15	15	15	16	16	16	16	15	15	15	15	15	15	15	14	14
Trelleborgs FF	13	10	12	14	14	14	14	14	14	14	14	14	14	14	14	14	14	14	14	14	14	14	14	14	14	14	14	14	15	15
Umeå FC	14	13	14	15	15	15	15	16	16	16	16	16	16	16	16	16	16	15	15	15	15	16	16	16	16	16	16	16	16	16

Promotion to Allsvenskan
Allsvenskan play-off
Superettan play-off
Relegation to Ettan

Updated to match(es) played on 8 November 2025. Source: everysport.com

== Results by round ==
Team ╲ Round	1	2	3	4	5	6	7	8	9	10	11	12	13	14	15	16	17	18	19	20	21	22	23	24	25	26	27	28	29	30
Falkenbergs FF	D	W	L	D	W	L	D	D	W	W	D	D	L	W	L	D	W	L	D	W	L	W	W	D	W	L	W	D	L	W
GIF Sundsvall	W	L	D	L	W	D	L	W	L	W	D	W	W	D	W	D	L	W	W	L	L	L	L	W	W	L	L	L	D	D
Helsingborgs IF	L	L	W	W	L	L	W	D	L	D	D	D	W	W	W	L	D	W	D	L	L	D	L	W	W	L	W	L	D	W
IK Brage	D	L	D	W	W	L	L	L	W	D	D	W	D	L	D	D	W	W	W	D	W	L	L	L	L	L	L	W	W	W
IK Oddevold	W	W	L	D	L	W	W	W	W	L	L	W	W	D	L	D	D	D	W	W	W	W	L	D	D	W	L	D	D	L
Kalmar FF	D	W	W	W	W	D	W	D	W	D	D	W	L	D	D	W	D	W	W	W	D	W	W	D	W	W	W	W	W	L
Landskrona BoIS	D	D	W	W	W	W	D	D	L	L	W	L	W	L	L	D	L	W	W	L	W	D	L	D	L	W	L	W	D	L
Sandvikens IF	D	W	W	L	L	L	W	D	L	L	W	W	W	W	L	D	L	L	L	L	W	W	L	L	L	D	D	W	W	W
Trelleborgs FF	L	W	L	L	L	D	L	W	L	D	L	D	L	D	W	L	D	L	L	W	L	L	L	L	L	W	L	D	L	D
Umeå FC	L	L	D	L	L	L	L	L	L	D	D	L	L	L	D	D	L	W	L	D	L	L	L	L	L	W	W	D	L	W
Utsiktens BK	L	L	L	W	D	D	D	W	D	D	D	D	W	D	L	L	W	L	D	L	L	L	W	L	W	L	W	L	L	L
Varbergs BoIS	D	W	D	W	W	W	W	L	W	D	L	W	L	D	L	W	L	L	D	D	W	W	W	D	D	L	D	D	L	L
Västerås SK	W	D	W	L	D	D	W	L	W	W	D	L	D	W	W	W	W	W	L	W	W	L	W	W	W	W	W	W	W	W
Örebro SK	L	L	L	L	L	D	L	L	D	L	D	L	L	D	D	D	D	L	L	D	L	W	W	D	L	W	L	L	W	D
Örgryte IS	W	D	D	W	L	W	D	W	W	D	W	L	W	L	W	W	W	D	W	D	W	W	W	W	W	D	L	L	L	D
Östersunds FK	W	D	D	L	W	W	L	D	L	W	D	L	L	D	W	L	D	L	L	D	D	L	W	W	L	L	W	D	W	L

Updated to match(es) played on 8 November 2025. Source: soccerstats.com
W = Win; D = Draw; L = Lose

== Results ==
Home \ Away	FAL	GIF	HEL	BRA	ODD	KAL	LAN	SAN	TRE	UME	UTS	VAR	VÄS	ÖRE	ÖRG	ÖFK
Falkenbergs FF		3–0	2–2	0–1	2–2	0–0	1–1	4–0	4–0	2–0	3–1	2–2	0–1	2–1	3–0	4–0
GIF Sundsvall	0–0		2–0	0–2	0–1	0–2	1–2	1–0	4–2	3–1	2–2	2–3	1–2	1–1	1–1	1–1
Helsingborgs IF	0–0	1–1		1–0	0–2	1–5	0–0	1–2	4–1	5–1	3–0	1–2	2–0	3–2	0–1	0–0
IK Brage	0–2	0–1	3–2		1–2	1–3	4–1	1–2	2–1	1–1	2–2	1–1	3–1	4–5	3–2	0–2
IK Oddevold	2–2	1–2	1–4	4–0		1–3	1–2	1–1	3–2	1–0	1–0	2–1	1–5	2–1	0–1	0–0
Kalmar FF	1–2	1–0	2–0	2–2	3–2		3–2	4–0	2–0	2–0	1–0	2–0	2–1	2–1	2–3	2–0
Landskrona BoIS	0–3	2–1	3–3	2–2	2–2	0–0		1–0	1–2	1–3	2–1	2–1	1–2	1–0	1–1	2–0
Sandvikens IF	4–1	0–1	0–1	2–5	0–2	0–0	0–1		2–0	2–1	3–1	2–1	0–3	2–1	1–1	5–0
Trelleborgs FF	1–1	2–1	0–0	0–1	0–0	0–0	1–0	1–2		0–2	1–1	0–4	5–0	1–1	0–2	0–1
Umeå FC	0–2	0–1	1–0	0–1	0–2	0–1	0–2	1–2	0–1		1–3	2–2	1–2	1–1	3–3	2–2
Utsiktens BK	2–2	4–1	1–2	2–1	0–2	1–1	4–0	4–1	3–1	1–4		1–1	2–2	4–4	1–2	1–0
Varbergs BoIS	3–2	0–2	1–0	1–2	1–1	0–0	4–2	0–0	3–1	4–0	1–1		1–0	2–1	1–2	1–1
Västerås SK	1–0	2–1	4–0	2–2	2–0	2–2	1–0	3–0	3–0	2–2	3–0	4–1		2–1	1–1	1–0
Örebro SK	4–1	1–2	0–2	3–3	0–0	2–2	1–2	0–1	0–0	1–1	2–1	1–1	0–2		1–3	2–0
Örgryte IS	4–2	0–0	0–2	2–2	0–0	0–2	2–0	4–0	2–0	3–1	2–1	5–1	0–2	3–0		6–0
Östersunds FK	3–1	1–3	2–2	1–0	1–3	0–0	3–3	2–2	2–0	3–0	2–1	0–1	1–6	3–1	2–1	

Source: svenskfotboll.se
Legend: Blue = home team win; Yellow = draw; Red = away team win.

== Season statistics ==
=== Top scorers ===
As of 8 November 2025

Rank	Player	Club	Goals
1	(Iraq) Amar Muhsin	IK Brage	21
2	(Sweden) Noah Christoffersson	Örgryte IS	18
3	(Norway) Eythor Bjørgolfsson	Umeå FC	15
4	(Sweden) Albin Andersson	Falkenbergs FF	13
4	(Sweden) Rasmus Wiedesheim-Paul	IK Oddevold	13
6	(Sweden) Kalle Holmberg	Örebro SK	12
6	(Sweden) Alexander Johansson	Utsikten/Helsingborg	12
6	(Sweden) Wilhelm Loeper	Helsingborgs IF	12
9	(Denmark) Mikkel Ladefoged	Västerås SK	10

=== Top assists ===
As of 8 November 2025

Rank	Player	Club	Assists
1	(Sweden) Isak Dahlqvist	Örgryte IS	12
2	(Sweden) Gustav Nordh	IK Brage	10
3	(Sweden) Camil Jebara	Kalmar FF	9
3	(Sweden) Wilhelm Loeper	Helsingborgs IF	9
3	(Sweden) Tobias Sana	Örgryte IS	9
3	(Sweden) Lucas Sibelius	Falkenbergs FF	9

=== Hat-tricks ===
Player	For	Against	Result	Date
(Sweden) Daniel Paulson	Örgryte IS	Falkenbergs FF	4–2	4 May 2025
(Sweden) Noah Christoffersson	Örgryte IS	Umeå FC	3–3	26 May 2025
(Iraq) Amar Muhsin	IK Brage	Sandvikens IF	2–5	2 August 2025
(Denmark) Mikkel Ladefoged	Västerås SK	Östersunds FK	1–6	4 October 2025
(Norway) Eythor Bjørgolfsson	Umeå FC	Utsiktens BK	1–4	8 November 2025

=== Discipline ===
==== Player ====
Most yellow cards: 12

- Hampus Söderström, Örebro SK

Most red cards: 1

- Viktor Frodig, IK Brage
- Ali Suljić, Östersunds FK
- Sebastian Lagerlund, Utsiktens BK
- Ervin Gigović, Helsingborgs IF
- Christian Stark, Landskrona BoIS
- Adrian Rogulj, IK Oddevold

==== Club ====
Most yellow cards: 27

- Utsiktens BK
