= 2024 IK Oddevold season =

IK Oddevold
2024 season
- Manager: Rikard Nilsson
- Stadium: Rimnersvallen
- Superettan: 12th
- Svenska Cupen: Group stage (Scheduled for the next season)
- Top goalscorer: League: Assad Al Hamlawi (14); All: Assad Al Hamlawi (14)
- Biggest win: Täby FK 0–2 IK Oddevold; Östersunds FK 0–2 IK Oddevold
- Biggest defeat: Östers IF 3–0 IK Oddevold; IK Oddevold 0–3 Helsingborgs IF; GIF Sundsvall 3–0 IK Oddevold; IK Oddevold 0–3 Trelleborgs FF

During the 2024 season, IK Oddevold competed in Superettan, the second tier of Swedish football, for the first time since 1997, and also participated in the Svenska Cupen.

== Squad ==
=== Transfers In ===
Pos.	Player	Transferred from	Fee	Date	Source
MF	(Sweden) Gustav Forssell	(Sweden) Torslanda IK		1 February 2024	
FW	(Uganda) John Paul Dembe	(Sweden) BK Häcken	Loan	11 March 2024	
FW	(Palestine) Assad Al Hamlawi	(Thailand) Prime Bangkok	Undisclosed	11 March 2024	

== Competitions ==
=== Superettan ===
Pos	Team	Pld	W	D	L	GF	GA	GD	Pts	Promotion, qualification or relegation
10	Varbergs BoIS	30	10	9	11	46	44	+2	39	
11	Örebro SK	30	10	9	11	37	36	+1	39	
12	IK Oddevold	30	8	12	10	34	47	−13	36	
13	GIF Sundsvall (O)	30	9	7	14	29	40	−11	34	Qualification for Superettan play-off
14	Östersunds FK (O)	30	8	8	14	30	44	−14	32	Qualification for Superettan play-off

Updated to match(es) played on 9 November 2024. Source: svenskfotboll.se
Rules for classification: 1) Points; 2) Goal difference; 3) Number of goals scored; 4) Head-to-head points; 5) Head-to-head goal difference; 6) Head-to-head away goals scored
(O) Play-off winners

==== Results summary ====
Overall								Home						Away					
Pld	W	D	L	GF	GA	GD	Pts	W	D	L	GF	GA	GD	W	D	L	GF	GA	GD
30	8	12	10	34	48	−14	36	4	7	4	16	22	−6	4	5	6	18	26	−8

==== Results by round ====
Round	1	2	3	4	5	6	7	8	9	10	11	12	13	14	15	16	17	18	19	20	21	22	23	24	25	26	27	28	29	30
Ground	A	H	A	H	A	H	A	H	A	H	A	A	H	A	H	A	A	H	H	A	H	H	A	H	A	H	A	H	A	H
Result	W	D	L	W	D	W	L	D	L	L	D	L	D	W	L	L	D	D	W	L	L	W	D	D	W	D	D	D	W	L
Position	3	5	8	6	5	4	5	6	9	11	11	12	12	9	12	14	13	13	13	13	14	12	13	13	11	11	12	12	12	12

A = Away; H = Home; W = Win; D = Draw; L = Loss

==== Matches ====
31 March 2024 1	Trelleborgs FF	1–2	IK Oddevold

8 April 2024 2	IK Oddevold	0–0	Örgryte IS

13 April 2024 3	Landskrona BoIS	2–1	IK Oddevold

21 April 2024 4	IK Oddevold	2–1	Gefle IF

30 April 2024 5	Skövde AIK	0–0	IK Oddevold

4 May 2024 6	IK Oddevold	1–0	GIF Sundsvall

10 May 2024 7	Östers IF	3–0	IK Oddevold

18 May 2024 8	IK Oddevold	1–1	IK Brage

23 May 2024 9	Varbergs BoIS	2–1	IK Oddevold

26 May 2024 10	IK Oddevold	1–2	Östersunds FK

2 June 2024 11	Örebro SK	2–2	IK Oddevold

16 June 2024 12	Sandvikens IF	2–0	IK Oddevold

23 June 2024 13	IK Oddevold	1–1	Degerfors IF

29 June 2024 14	Utsiktens BK	2–3	IK Oddevold

20 July 2024 15	IK Oddevold	0–3	Helsingborgs IF

29 July 2024 16	Örgryte IS	4–2	IK Oddevold

3 August 2024 17	Degerfors IF	2–2	IK Oddevold

11 August 2024 18	IK Oddevold	2–2	Sandvikens IF

16 August 2024 19	IK Oddevold	2–1	Utsiktens BK

26 August 2024 20	GIF Sundsvall	3–0	IK Oddevold

1 September 2024 21	IK Oddevold	0–3	Landskrona BoIS

14 September 2024 22	IK Oddevold	3–2	Varbergs BoIS

19 September 2024 23	Helsingborgs IF	0–0	IK Oddevold

23 September 2024 24	IK Oddevold	0–0	Örebro SK

30 September 2024 25	Östersunds FK	0–2	IK Oddevold

6 October 2024 26	IK Oddevold	1–1	Östers IF

19 October 2024 27	Gefle IF	1–1	IK Oddevold

28 October 2024 28	IK Oddevold	2–2	Skövde AIK

3 November 2024 29	IK Brage	1–2	IK Oddevold

9 November 2024 30	IK Oddevold	0–3	Trelleborgs FF

=== Svenska Cupen ===
22 August 2024 Round 2	Täby FK	0–2	IK Oddevold	Täby
				Stadium: Tibblevallen; Attendance: 222; Referee: Teddy Dahlin
