= Daniel Krezic =

Macedonian footballer

Personal information
- Date of birth: 3 May 1996 (age 30)
- Place of birth: Gothenburg, Sweden
- Height: 1.86 m (6 ft 1 in)
- Positions: Left midfielder; right midfielder

Team information
- Current team: IK Oddevold
- Number: 11

Youth career
- –2016: BK Häcken

Senior career*
Years	Team	Apps	(Gls)
2016–2018	Oddevold	59	(11)
2018–2021	Varbergs BoIS	45	(8)
2022	Degerfors	10	(0)
2023	Cork City	18	(1)
2023–	IK Oddevold	77	(11)

International career
2014	North Macedonia U19	3	(1)
2017	North Macedonia U21	1	(0)
- * Club domestic league appearances and goals as of 12 November 2026

Daniel Krezic (born 3 May 1996) is a professional footballer who plays as a left midfielder or right midfielder for IK Oddevold. Born in Sweden, he represents North Macedonia internationally.

== Club career ==
On 23 January 2022, Krezic signed a two-year contract with Degerfors.

Krezic signed for League of Ireland Premier Division club Cork City on 1 February 2023. On 2 August 2023, it was announced that Krezic had departed the club to return to Sweden.

On 8 August 2023, it was announced that Krezic had signed for his former Swedish club IK Oddevold. He initially signed a contract for the rest of the season.

== Career statistics ==
=== Club ===
As of match played 23 October 2024

Appearances and goals by club, season and competition
Club	Season	League			National cup (Note: Includes Svenska Cupen, FAI Cup)		Other		Total	
Club	Season	Division	Apps	Goals	Apps	Goals	Apps	Goals	Goals	Apps
Oddevold	2016	Ettan	20	4	—		—		20	4
Oddevold	2017	Ettan	23	4	—		—		23	4
Oddevold	2018	Ettan	16	3	1	1	—		17	4
Oddevold	Total		59	11	1	1	—		60	12
Varbergs BoIS	2018	Superettan	7	2	1	0	2 (Note: Appearance(s) in Superettan promotion/relegation play-offs)	1	10	3
Varbergs BoIS	2019	Superettan	28	4	4	0	—		32	4
Varbergs BoIS	2020	Allsvenskan	9	2	2	0	—		11	2
Varbergs BoIS	2021	Allsvenskan	1	0	—		—		1	0
Varbergs BoIS	Total		45	8	7	0	2	1	54	9
Degerfors	2022	Allsvenskan	10	0	4	0	—		14	0
Cork City	2023	LOI Premier Division	18	1	0	0	0	0	18	1
Oddevold	2023	Ettan	13	3	0	0	—		13	3
Oddevold	2024	Superettan	24	3	1	0	—		25	3
Oddevold	Total		37	6	1	0	—		38	6
Career total			169	26	13	1	2	1	184	28
