= Jesper Westermark =

Swedish footballer

Personal information
- Full name: Jesper Viktor Johannes Jonasson Westermark
- Date of birth: 25 July 1993 (age 33)
- Place of birth: Sweden
- Height: 1.83 m (6 ft 0 in)
- Position: Forward

Team information
- Current team: Varberg (on loan from Varbergs)
- Number: 15

Youth career
- Sävedalens IF
- Häcken

Senior career*
Years	Team	Apps	(Gls)
2012–2013	Häcken	2	(0)
2013–2014	Oddevold	49	(21)
2015–2017	Utsikten	74	(24)
2018	GAIS	22	(6)
2019–2020	Ljungskile	51	(26)
2021–2023	Öster	83	(29)
2024	Wisła Płock	16	(2)
2024–	Halmstad	3	(0)
2025–	→ Varbergs (loan)	27	(7)
- * Club domestic league appearances and goals as of 13 November 2025

Jesper Jonasson Westermark (born 25 July 1993) is a Swedish professional footballer who plays as a forward for Varbergs BoIS, on loan from Halmstad.

== Career ==
For the 2015 season, Westermark signed with Utsikten.

On 24 January 2019, Westermark officially signed with Ljungskile for one year.

For the 2021 season, Westermark joined Öster.

On 31 January 2024, Polish second division outfit Wisła Płock announced the signing of Westermark on an eighteen-month contract. He left the club by mutual consent on 5 August 2024.

== Honours ==
Individual

- Superettan top scorer: 2023
