= Assad Al Hamlawi =

Footballer (born 2000)

- Al Hamlawi with Universitatea Craiova in 2025

Personal information
- Full name: Assad Al Islam Al Hamlawi
- Date of birth: 27 October 2000 (age 26)
- Place of birth: Helsingborg, Sweden
- Height: 1.88 m (6 ft 2 in)
- Position: Forward

Team information
- Current team: Universitatea Craiova
- Number: 9

Youth career
- –2018: Ängelholm

Senior career*
Years	Team	Apps	(Gls)
2017–2019	Ängelholm	18	(14)
2020–2023	Helsingborg	37	(5)
2022	→ Jönköping Södra (loan)	10	(2)
2023	Varberg BoIS	8	(1)
2023	Ängelholm	15	(4)
2024	Prime Bangkok	11	(9)
2024–2025	Oddevold	28	(14)
2025	Śląsk Wrocław	16	(7)
2025–	Universitatea Craiova	44	(18)

International career^{‡}
2025–	Palestine	8	(5)
- * Club domestic league appearances and goals as of 8 November 2026 ‡ National team caps and goals as of 19 November 2026

Assad Al Islam Al Hamlawi (Arabic: أسد الإسلام الحملاوي; born 27 October 2000) is a professional footballer who plays as a striker for Liga I club Universitatea Craiova. Born in Sweden, he plays for the Palestine national team.

== Club career ==
Al Hamlawi started his career at Ängelholm, before signing for Helsingborgs IF in August 2019, agreeing to a three-year contract starting on 1 January 2020.

On 7 June 2022, Al Hamlawi was loaned out to Jönköpings Södra for the remainder of the season. Following the 2022 season, he left Helsingborgs IF. In December 2022, he signed a four-year contract with Varbergs BoIS. In June 2023, his contract with Varbergs BoIS was terminated. The following month, he returned to Ängelholm.

In January 2024, Al Hamlawi signed for Thai third-tier club Prime Bangkok. In March 2024, he signed a two-year contract with Oddevold.

In January 2025, Al Hamlawi signed for Polish club Śląsk Wrocław on a 2.5-year contract. In July 2025, he signed for Romanian club Universitatea Craiova on a three-year contract. The transfer fee was reported to be around €1 million. A year later, on 17 May, he scored a brace in a 5–0 victory over Universitatea Cluj, helping his club secure their fifth league title and first since the 1990–91 season.

== Career statistics ==
=== Club ===
As of match played 5 November 2026

Appearances and goals by club, season and competition
Club	Season	League			National cup (Note: Includes Svenska Cupen, Cupa României)		Continental		Other		Total	
Club	Season	Division	Apps	Goals	Apps	Goals	Apps	Goals	Apps	Goals	Apps	Goals
Ängelholm	2017	Ettan	1	0	—		—		—		1	0
Ängelholm	2018	Ettan	0	0	0	0	—		—		0	1
Ängelholm	2019	Division 2	17	14	2	0	—		—		34	5
Ängelholm	Total		18	14	0	0	—		—		18	14
Helsingborg	2020	Allsvenskan	9	1	0	0	—		—		9	1
Helsingborg	2021	Superettan	18	3	0	0	—		2 (Note: Appearance in Allsvenskan promotion/relegation play-offs)	0	20	3
Helsingborg	2022	Allsvenskan	10	1	0	0	—		—		10	1
Helsingborg	Total		37	5	0	0	—		2	0	39	5
Jönköping Södra (loan)	2022	Superettan	10	2	—		—		—		10	2
Varberg BoIS	2023	Allsvenskan	8	1	3	0	—		—		11	3
Ängelholm	2023	Ettan	15	4	—		—		2 (Note: Appearances in Ettan relegation play-offs)	2	17	6
Prime Bangkok	2023–24	Thai League 3	11	9	—		—		—		11	9
Oddevold	2024	Superettan	28	14	0	0	—		—		28	14
Śląsk Wrocław	2024–25	Ekstraklasa	16	7	—		—		—		16	7
Universitatea Craiova	2025–26	Liga I	33	11	4	0	11 (Note: Appearances in UEFA Conference League)	5	—		48	16
Universitatea Craiova	2026–27	Liga I	10	7	0	0	9 (Note: Two appearances and two goals in UEFA Champions League, four appearances in UEFA Europa League, three appearances in UEFA Conference League and two goals)	4	1 (Note: Appearance in Supercupa României)	0	20	11
Universitatea Craiova	Total		43	18	4	0	20	9	1	0	68	27
Career total			186	74	9	0	20	9	5	2	220	85

=== International ===
As of match player 19 November 2026

Appearances and goals by national team and year
National team	Year	Apps	Goals
Palestine
Palestine	2025	3	0
Palestine	2026	5	5
Total		8	5

Scores and results list Palestine's goal tally first, score column indicates score after each Al Hamlawi goal.

List of international goals scored by Assad Al Hamlawi
No.	Date	Venue	Opponent	Score	Result	Competition
1	24 September 2026	Tongliang Long Stadium, Chongqing, China	New Zealand	1–1	2–2	Friendly
2	28 September 2026	Tongliang Long Stadium, Chongqing, China	Tajikistan	1–2	4–2	Friendly
3	28 September 2026	Tongliang Long Stadium, Chongqing, China	Tajikistan	2–2	4–2	Friendly
4	2 October 2026	Longxing Football Stadium, Chongqing, China	China	1–0	5–0	Friendly
5	2 October 2026	Longxing Football Stadium, Chongqing, China	China	2–0	5–0	Friendly

== Honours ==
Universitatea Craiova

- Liga I: 2025–26
- Cupa României: 2025–26
- Supercupa Românieiː 2026

Individual

- Superettan top scorer: 2024 (shared with Kalle Holmberg and Dijan Vukojević)
- Liga I Team of the Season: 2025–26
