= Wilhelm Loeper (footballer) =

Swedish footballer (born 1998)

Personal information
- Full name: Wilhelm Axel Ulfsson Loeper
- Date of birth: 30 March 1998 (age 28)
- Place of birth: Stockholm, Sweden
- Height: 1.89 m (6 ft 2 in)
- Positions: Winger; defender

Team information
- Current team: Dibba Al-Hisn

Youth career
- 2004–2018: Djurgården

Senior career*
Years	Team	Apps	(Gls)
2018	Arameisk-Syrianska	29	(3)
2019–2020	Eskilstuna	56	(4)
2021–2025	Helsingborg	126	(25)
2026	FK Csíkszereda	10	(0)
2026–	Dibba Al-Hisn	0	(0)
- * Club domestic league appearances and goals as of 8 May 2026

Wilhelm Axel Ulfsson Loeper (born 30 March 1998) is a Swedish professional footballer who plays as a winger or a defender for UAE Pro League club Dibba Al-Hisn.

== Club career ==
=== Helsingborgs IF ===
Ahead of the 2021 season, Loeper signed for the Superettan club Helsingborgs IF after having played two full seasons with AFC Eskilstuna. In his first season with the Scanian club, Loeper scored 3 goals and 12 assists, effectively winning him the assist league. Helsingborg finished third in the 2021 Superettan and subsequently won their promotion play-off against relegation-threatened Allsvenskan club, Halmstads BK. In tis match, Loeper scored the first goal and achieved promotion.

Loeper missed a majority of the following 2022 Allsvenskan due to a pre-season injury. Helsingborg finished 15th and were automatically relegated to Superettan. In the few matches he played, Loeper scored 1 goal and 2 assists. In the 2023 Superettan, Helsingborg narrowly avoided automatic relegation and relegation play-off thanks to their goal differential. This season Loeper was awarded the "årets HIF:are" as the best footballer in the club that season.

During the 2024 Superettan, Loeper scored 6 goals and 7 assists and propelled Helsingborg to a 4th place, just 2 points behind regional rivals Landskrona BoIS. The 2025 Superettan would be his last and statistically best season with Helsingborg. He scored 12 goals and 6 assists and reached only 6th place. With his five year contract coming to an end, Loeper decided not to renew and he wanted to leave the club.

=== FK Csíkszereda ===
Loeper's move to Romanian side FK Csíkszereda was marred with controversy. Initially, Loeper and his agent had been negotiating with South Korean club Incheon United FC and Loeper had expressed his interest in moving to the club. Loeper had visited the Korean club and during his visit had approved and delegated his agent to negotiate with FK Csíkszereda, seemingly his second-choice club. However, Loeper was unexpectedly registered and presented by the Romanian club. Loeper's move to Csíkszereda was completely unanticipated from Swedish media and negatively perceived due the agent's handling of the situation. Loeper left FK Csíkszereda as a free agent.
