= 2024 Superettan =

Superettan
- Season: 2024
- Dates: 30 March 2024 – 9 November 2024
- Champions: Degerfors IF
- Promoted: Degerfors IF; Östers IF
- Relegated: Gefle IF; Skövde AIK
- Matches: 240
- Goals: 633 (2.64 per match)
- Top goalscorer: Assad Al Hamlawi; Kalle Holmberg; Dijan Vukojević (14 goals each)
- Biggest home win: Brage 5–0 Sundsvall (23 June 2024)
- Biggest away win: Gefle 0–4 Varberg (10 August 2024)
- Highest scoring: Östersund 4–3 Gefle (22 May 2024); Varberg 4–3 Gefle (23 June 2024); Landskrona 4–3 Örgryte (24 June 2024); Landskrona 4–3 Östersund (30 June 2024)
- Longest winning run: Degerfors (7)
- Longest unbeaten run: Degerfors (11)
- Longest winless run: Skövde (15)
- Longest losing run: Varberg; Utsikten; Skövde (4)
- Highest attendance: 12,768; Helsingborg 0–1 Landskrona (26 May 2024)
- Lowest attendance: 156; Utsikten 0–2 Trelleborg (10 August 2024)
- Total attendance: 529,220
- Average attendance: 2,508
- All statistics correct as of 10 November 2024.

The 2024 Superettan was the 25th season of Superettan, Sweden's second-tier football division in its current format. It is part of the 2024 Swedish football season and contested by 16 teams. The season kicked off on 30 March and concluded on 9 November. The summer break took place between 2–20 July.

== Teams ==
A total of 16 teams contest the league. The top two teams qualify directly for promotion to Allsvenskan, the third will enter a play-off for the chance of promotion. The two bottom teams are automatically relegated, while the 13th and 14th placed teams will compete in a play-off to determine whether they are relegated.

The following teams have changed division since the 2023 season:

=== To Superettan ===
Promoted from Ettan

- Sandvikens IF – Winner Ettan Norra
- IK Oddevold – Winner Ettan Södra

Relegated from Allsvenskan

- Degerfors IF
- Varbergs BoIS

=== From Superettan ===
Promoted to Allsvenskan

- Västerås SK
- GAIS

Relegated to Ettan

- Jönköpings Södra IF
- AFC Eskilstuna

=== Stadia and locations ===
Locations of the 2024 Superettan teams

Team	Location	Stadium	Stadium capacity
Degerfors IF	Degerfors	Stora Valla	5,880
Gefle IF	Gävle	Gavlevallen	6,432
GIF Sundsvall	Sundsvall	NP3 Arena	8,000
Helsingborgs IF	Helsingborg	Olympia	16,000
IK Brage	Borlänge	Borlänge Energi Arena	6,500
IK Oddevold	Uddevalla	Rimnersvallen	4,000
Landskrona BoIS	Landskrona	Landskrona IP	10,000
Sandvikens IF	Sandviken	Jernvallen	7,000
Skövde AIK	Skövde	Södermalms IP	4,646
Trelleborgs FF	Trelleborg	Vångavallen	7,357
Utsiktens BK	Gothenburg	Bravida Arena	6,316
Varbergs BoIS	Varberg	Påskbergsvallen	4,575
Örebro SK	Örebro	Behrn Arena	13,072
Örgryte IS	Gothenburg	Gamla Ullevi	18,454
Östers IF	Växjö	Visma Arena	12,000
Östersunds FK	Östersund	Jämtkraft Arena	8,466

== League table ==
Pos	Team	Pld	W	D	L	GF	GA	GD	Pts	Promotion, qualification or relegation
1	Degerfors IF (C, P)	30	15	10	5	50	28	+22	55	Promotion to Allsvenskan
2	Östers IF (P)	30	15	9	6	55	31	+24	54	Promotion to Allsvenskan
3	Landskrona BoIS	30	14	7	9	46	34	+12	49	Qualification for Allsvenskan play-off
4	Helsingborgs IF	30	13	8	9	41	34	+7	47	
5	Örgryte IS	30	12	8	10	50	43	+7	44	
6	Sandvikens IF	30	12	7	11	49	41	+8	43	
7	Trelleborgs FF	30	12	6	12	33	38	−5	42	
8	IK Brage	30	11	8	11	31	29	+2	41	
9	Utsiktens BK	30	11	8	11	39	38	+1	41	
10	Varbergs BoIS	30	10	9	11	46	44	+2	39	
11	Örebro SK	30	10	9	11	37	36	+1	39	
12	IK Oddevold	30	8	12	10	34	47	−13	36	
13	GIF Sundsvall (O)	30	9	7	14	29	40	−11	34	Qualification for Superettan play-off
14	Östersunds FK (O)	30	8	8	14	30	44	−14	32	Qualification for Superettan play-off
15	Gefle IF (R)	30	8	8	14	37	54	−17	32	Relegation to Ettan
16	Skövde AIK (R)	30	5	10	15	26	52	−26	25	Relegation to Ettan

Updated to match(es) played on 9 November 2024. Source: svenskfotboll.se
Rules for classification: 1) Points; 2) Goal difference; 3) Number of goals scored; 4) Head-to-head points; 5) Head-to-head goal difference; 6) Head-to-head away goals scored
(C) Champions; (O) Play-off winners; (P) Promoted; (R) Relegated

=== Superettan play-off ===
The thirteenth and fourteenth-placed teams from Superettan will face one of the two runners-up from the 2024 Ettan in two-legged ties for the final two places in the 2025 Superettan.

21 November 2024
19:00 CET

FC Stockholm	0–1	GIF Sundsvall
	Report	Kagayama 85'

Hammarby IP, Stockholm
Attendance: 1,945
Referee: Oscar Johnson
24 November 2024

GIF Sundsvall	3–2 (a.e.t.)	FC Stockholm
Svanberg 68'; Engblom 111'; Nordh 120+1'	Report	Zlotnik 31'; Dahlström 88'

Idrottsparken, Sundsvall
Referee: Adam Ladebäck

GIF Sundsvall won 4–2 on aggregate.

21 November 2024
18:30 CET

Lunds BK	0–2	Östersunds FK
	Report	N'sa 19'; Sporrong 25'

Klostergårdens IP, Lund
Attendance: 2,156
Referee: Richard Sundell
24 November 2024

Östersunds FK	3–2	Lunds BK
Marklund 16'; Hopcutt 26'; Kroon 90'	Report	Ekblom 4', 71'

Jämtkraft Arena, Östersund
Referee: Joakim Östling

Östersunds FK won 5–2 on aggregate.

== Positions by round ==
Team ╲ Round	1	2	3	4	5	6	7	8	9	10	11	12	13	14	15	16	17	18	19	20	21	22	23	24	25	26	27	28	29	30
Degerfors IF	8	2	5	2	2	6	8	5	4	4	2	2	4	3	3	3	2	2	4	3	2	2	1	1	1	1	1	1	1	1
Östers IF	9	4	2	5	3	5	3	3	2	2	3	4	3	2	2	2	3	4	2	5	5	5	3	3	2	2	3	2	2	2
Landskrona BoIS	1	1	1	1	1	1	1	1	1	1	1	1	1	1	1	1	1	1	1	1	1	1	2	2	4	3	4	3	3	3
Helsingborgs IF	2	3	6	10	10	7	6	7	10	12	9	8	8	6	5	4	4	5	3	2	3	4	4	4	3	4	2	4	4	4
Örgryte IS	12	13	15	16	15	16	14	14	16	16	14	15	15	15	15	12	9	8	9	11	9	8	7	7	7	8	7	8	6	5
Sandvikens IF	16	11	13	9	9	12	10	9	8	7	5	3	2	4	4	7	6	6	6	4	4	3	5	6	5	5	5	5	5	6
Trelleborgs FF	11	14	11	14	14	11	9	12	7	5	7	7	7	8	8	9	11	9	7	8	8	7	8	8	8	7	8	7	8	7
IK Brage	5	5	3	3	4	3	2	2	5	6	6	6	5	5	6	5	5	3	5	6	6	6	6	5	6	6	6	6	7	8
Utsiktens BK	4	7	7	4	6	2	4	4	3	3	4	5	6	7	7	6	7	7	8	7	7	9	9	9	10	9	10	9	10	9
Varbergs BoIS	13	15	10	12	13	15	16	16	15	15	15	14	10	12	13	15	15	12	12	9	10	11	10	12	12	12	11	11	11	10
Örebro SK	14	16	16	13	11	9	7	8	11	13	12	13	14	10	11	13	10	11	10	12	11	13	11	10	9	10	9	10	9	11
IK Oddevold	3	6	8	6	5	4	5	6	9	11	11	12	12	9	12	14	13	13	13	13	14	12	13	13	11	11	12	12	12	12
GIF Sundsvall	6	10	4	8	8	10	13	13	14	14	16	16	16	16	16	16	16	16	16	15	15	15	15	15	14	15	15	15	15	13
Östersunds FK	15	9	12	11	12	13	15	15	13	10	13	11	9	11	9	8	8	10	11	10	12	10	12	11	13	13	13	13	14	14
Gefle IF	10	12	14	15	15	14	12	11	12	9	10	10	13	14	14	10	12	14	14	14	13	14	14	14	15	14	14	14	13	15
Skövde AIK	7	8	9	7	7	8	11	10	6	8	8	9	11	13	10	11	14	15	15	16	16	16	16	16	16	16	16	16	16	16

Promotion to Allsvenskan
Allsvenskan play-off
Superettan play-off
Relegation to Ettan

Updated to match(es) played on 9 November 2024. Source: everysport.com

== Results by round ==
Team ╲ Round	1	2	3	4	5	6	7	8	9	10	11	12	13	14	15	16	17	18	19	20	21	22	23	24	25	26	27	28	29	30
IK Brage	W	D	W	D	L	W	W	D	L	L	W	L	W	D	L	W	W	W	D	L	L	D	D	W	L	L	W	L	L	D
Degerfors IF	D	W	D	W	D	L	L	W	W	D	W	W	D	W	L	W	D	D	D	W	W	W	W	W	W	W	L	D	D	L
Gefle IF	L	D	D	L	D	D	W	W	L	W	L	L	L	D	D	W	L	L	L	W	W	L	L	D	L	W	D	L	W	L
GIF Sundsvall	W	L	W	L	D	L	L	L	D	L	L	D	L	L	L	W	W	D	L	W	D	D	W	L	W	L	L	D	W	W
Helsingborgs IF	W	D	D	L	D	W	D	D	L	L	W	W	L	W	W	W	W	D	W	W	L	L	D	W	W	L	W	D	L	L
Landskrona BoIS	W	D	W	D	W	W	W	D	L	W	W	W	W	W	D	L	W	D	L	L	W	D	L	L	L	W	L	W	D	L
IK Oddevold	W	D	L	W	D	W	L	D	L	L	D	L	D	W	L	L	D	D	W	L	L	W	D	D	W	D	D	D	W	L
Sandvikens IF	L	W	L	W	D	L	D	W	D	W	W	W	W	L	L	L	W	D	W	W	D	D	L	L	W	W	L	D	L	L
Skövde AIK	W	D	L	W	D	L	L	W	W	L	D	L	L	L	W	L	L	L	L	D	L	D	D	D	L	L	D	D	L	D
Trelleborgs FF	L	L	W	L	D	W	D	D	W	W	L	W	D	L	D	L	L	W	W	L	W	W	L	D	L	W	L	W	L	W
Utsiktens BK	W	D	D	W	L	W	D	D	W	W	L	L	L	L	W	W	L	L	L	W	D	L	D	D	L	W	D	W	L	W
Varbergs BoIS	L	L	W	L	D	L	L	L	L	D	D	W	W	L	D	L	L	W	W	W	D	L	D	L	D	D	W	D	W	W
Örebro SK	L	L	L	W	W	D	W	D	L	L	D	L	D	W	D	L	W	L	W	L	D	L	W	D	W	D	W	L	W	D
Örgryte IS	L	D	L	D	D	L	W	L	L	L	W	D	L	W	D	W	W	W	L	L	W	W	W	D	D	L	W	D	W	W
Östers IF	D	W	W	L	D	D	W	D	W	W	L	D	W	W	W	L	L	D	W	L	D	D	W	W	W	D	L	W	W	W
Östersunds FK	L	W	L	D	D	D	L	L	W	W	L	D	W	L	W	W	L	D	L	D	L	W	L	D	L	L	W	L	L	D

Updated to match(es) played on 9 November 2024. Source: soccerstats.com
W = Win; D = Draw; L = Lose

== Results ==
Home \ Away	BRA	DEG	GEF	GIF	HEL	LAN	ODD	SAN	SKÖ	TRE	UTS	VAR	ÖRE	ÖRG	ÖST	ÖFK
IK Brage		0–1	2–2	5–0	0–3	1–1	1–2	1–2	2–0	1–0	0–0	1–0	2–0	0–2	1–0	2–1
Degerfors IF	1–1		1–0	2–0	2–1	1–3	2–2	4–1	2–0	2–0	3–1	1–1	1–2	4–1	1–2	2–0
Gefle IF	2–1	2–2		1–0	2–3	1–2	1–1	2–2	2–0	2–2	2–0	0–4	3–1	2–3	2–1	0–0
GIF Sundsvall	0–0	1–2	3–0		1–3	1–3	3–0	0–0	3–1	2–1	1–0	1–1	1–3	1–1	0–2	1–0
Helsingborgs IF	1–1	1–1	4–0	2–1		0–1	0–0	2–2	0–1	0–3	1–1	1–0	1–0	1–2	3–2	0–0
Landskrona BoIS	3–0	1–1	0–2	0–0	0–1		2–1	4–0	4–1	2–0	1–0	1–4	0–0	4–3	0–0	4–3
IK Oddevold	1–1	1–1	2–1	1–0	0–3	0–3		2–2	2–2	0–3	2–1	3–2	0–0	0–0	1–1	1–2
Sandvikens IF	0–1	0–1	4–0	1–2	2–2	2–0	2–0		2–2	4–0	1–2	3–1	2–1	3–1	1–0	3–1
Skövde AIK	1–0	0–2	0–1	0–2	1–3	0–0	0–0	0–2		1–0	1–1	2–2	2–2	0–2	1–2	1–0
Trelleborgs FF	1–0	1–1	1–0	3–2	0–0	1–3	1–2	1–0	1–1		2–2	0–1	2–1	1–0	1–4	1–0
Utsiktens BK	1–0	0–3	0–0	1–0	4–0	3–0	2–3	2–1	4–1	0–2		0–1	3–2	1–1	1–1	3–1
Varbergs BoIS	0–1	0–0	4–3	3–0	0–3	1–1	2–1	2–1	2–2	0–1	1–1		1–1	1–3	1–2	2–0
Örebro SK	2–1	2–1	4–1	0–0	2–1	1–0	2–2	1–0	0–1	1–1	0–1	3–1		0–0	0–1	4–1
Örgryte IS	1–2	1–3	3–0	1–1	0–1	2–1	4–2	4–2	2–0	1–2	1–2	3–3	3–1		2–2	2–1
Östers IF	0–2	1–1	0–0	2–0	4–0	2–1	3–0	2–2	5–2	4–1	5–2	3–4	2–0	1–0		1–1
Östersunds FK	1–1	2–1	4–3	1–2	1–0	2–1	0–2	0–2	2–2	1–0	1–0	2–1	1–1	1–1	0–0	

Updated to match(es) played on 9 November 2024. Source: svenskfotboll.se
Legend: Blue = home team win; Yellow = draw; Red = away team win.

== Season statistics ==
=== Top scorers ===
As of 9 November 2024

Rank	Player	Club	Goals
1	(Sweden) Assad Al Hamlawi	IK Oddevold	14
1	(Sweden) Kalle Holmberg	Örebro SK	14
1	(Sweden) Dijan Vukojević	Degerfors IF	14
4	(Sweden) Alibek Aliev	Östers IF	13
4	(Portugal) Ieltsin Camões	IK Brage	13
4	(Sweden) Gustav Lindgren	Degerfors IF	13
4	(Sweden) Taylor Silverholt	Helsingborgs IF	13
8	(Sweden) Isak Bjerkebo	Varbergs BoIS	11
8	(Sweden) Edi Sylisufaj	Örgryte/Landskrona	11

=== Top assists ===
As of 9 November 2024

Rank	Player	Club	Assists
1	(Sweden) Adam Bergmark Wiberg	Östers IF	13
2	(Sweden) Anton Kurochkin	Varbergs BoIS	10
3	(Sweden) Kevin Holmén	Degerfors IF	9
4	(Sweden) Robin Dzabic	Landskrona BoIS	8
4	(Sweden) Ervin Gigović	Helsingborgs IF	8
4	(Sweden) David Seger	Östers IF	8
7	(Sweden) Lukas Bergquist	Östers IF	7
7	(Sweden) Wilhelm Loeper	Helsingborgs IF	7
7	(Sweden) Elias Pihlström	Degerfors IF	7

=== Hat-tricks ===
Player	For	Against	Result	Date
(Sweden) Kofi Asare	Landskrona BoIS	Sandvikens IF	4–0	31 March 2024
(Portugal) Ieltsin Camões	IK Brage	GIF Sundsvall	5–0	23 June 2024
(Sweden) Daniel Ljung	Östers IF	Trelleborgs FF	1–4	30 June 2024
(Sweden) Noah Christoffersson	Örgryte IS	IK Oddevold	4–2	29 July 2024
(Sweden) Taylor Silverholt	Helsingborgs IF	IK Brage	0–3	27 August 2024

=== Discipline ===
==== Player ====
Most yellow cards: 10

- Mamadou Ousmane Diagne, Skövde AIK

Most red cards: 2

- Mattis Adolfsson, Östers IF

==== Club ====
Most yellow cards: 59
Utsikten

== Attendances ==
#	Club	Average
1	Helsingborgs IF	7,299
2	Örebro SK	4,287
3	Östers IF	3,903
4	Landskrona BoIS	3,530
5	Degerfors IF	3,257
6	GIF Sundsvall	3,024
7	Örgryte IS	2,337
8	Östersunds FK	2,258
9	IK Brage	2,037
10	Gefle IF	1,760
11	Varbergs BoIS	1,547
12	Sandvikens IF	1,512
13	IK Oddevold	1,198
14	Trelleborgs FF	1,005
15	Skövde AIK	854
16	Utsikten BK	447
