= Rikard Nilsson =

Swedish footballer

Personal information
- Date of birth: 24 May 1983 (age 43)
- Place of birth: Sweden
- Height: 1.85 m (6 ft 1 in)
- Position: Defender

Team information
- Current team: IK Oddevold (manager)

Youth career
- Vänersborgs IF
- IF Elfsborg

Senior career*
Years	Team	Apps	(Gls)
2003–2005	Boden	43	(0)
2006–2008	Trollhättan	57	(2)
2009–2010	Lyn	8	(0)
2010–2013	Ljungskile	63	(0)
2014–2016	Levanger	51	(0)
2017–	IK Gauthiod	69	(5)

Managerial career
- 2020–: Oddevold
- * Club domestic league appearances and goals

Rikard Nilsson (born 24 May 1983) is a Swedish footballer and manager. A defender during his career, he retired in 2020.

Nilsson started his career in Vänersborgs IF, and played for Bodens BK, IF Elfsborg and FC Trollhättan before joining Lyn in January 2009. He made his Norwegian Premier League debut for Lyn on 3 May 2009 against Stabæk.

Nilsson led IK Oddevold to a second place in the 2021 Division 2, then victory and promotion, followed by a third place in the 2022 Ettan, then another victory in 2023 Ettan and promotion, and a 12th place in the 2024 Superettan.
