= Dijan Vukojević =

Swedish footballer

Personal information
- Date of birth: 12 September 1995 (age 31)
- Place of birth: Jönköping, Sweden
- Height: 1.83 m (6 ft 0 in)
- Positions: Attacking midfielder; winger

Team information
- Current team: Degerfors IF
- Number: 11

Youth career
- Råslätts SK

Senior career*
Years	Team	Apps	(Gls)
2011−2012	Råslätts SK	34	(15)
2013−2014	Jönköpings Södra IF	18	(1)
2015	Arameisk-Syrianska IF	25	(5)
2016−2017	Assyriska IK	38	(25)
2018	Husqvarna FF	27	(5)
2019	Norrby IF	24	(8)
2020	Spartak Trnava	8	(2)
2020–2021	Norrby IF	50	(18)
2022–2024	Degerfors IF	64	(20)
2025	Wieczysta Kraków	10	(2)
2025–	Degerfors IF	25	(9)
- * Club domestic league appearances and goals as of 16 August 2026

Dijan Vukojević (born 12 September 1995) is a Swedish professional footballer who plays as an attacking midfielder or winger for Allsvenskan club Degerfors IF.

== Club career ==
A prolific player on Sweden's second and third tier, Vukojević earned a transfer to the Slovak top flight in early 2020. He made his Fortuna Liga debut for Spartak Trnava against Slovan Bratislava on 16 February 2020. Already in the summer of 2020, he returned to Sweden.

On 23 January 2022, Vukojević signed a three-year contract with Degerfors IF.

On 17 December 2024, he signed an eighteen-month deal with Polish third-tier club Wieczysta Kraków, with an option for a further year. On 14 August 2025, Vukojević terminated his contract by mutual consent.

On 29 August 2025, Vukojević rejoined Degerfors IF on a four-month deal.

== Honours ==
Degerfors IF

- Superettan: 2024

Individual

- Superettan top scorer: 2024 (shared with Assad Al Hamlawi and Kalle Holmberg)
