= Gustav Nordh =

Swedish footballer (born 2000)

Personal information
- Date of birth: 28 May 2000 (age 26)
- Height: 1.75 m (5 ft 9 in)
- Positions: Left winger; forward

Team information
- Current team: Lillestrøm
- Number: 15

Youth career
- –2016: Piteå IF

Senior career*
Years	Team	Apps	(Gls)
2016–2019	Piteå IF	75	(25)
2020	Team TG FF	26	(3)
2021	Varbergs BoIS	0	(0)
2021	→ Gefle IF (loan)	13	(2)
2022–2023	Piteå IF	52	(15)
2024	GIF Sundsvall	26	(3)
2025–2026	IK Brage	44	(12)
2026–	Lillestrøm	4	(0)
- * Club domestic league appearances and goals as of 29 August 2026

Gustav Nordh (born 28 May 2000) is a Swedish footballer who plays as a left winger for Lillestrøm.

== Career ==
Nordh started playing for Piteå IF as a child, and made his senior debut in 2016. In 2020 he moved to Team TG FF, playing on the second tier. He notably scored some goals against the larger clubs in the league, and was possibly scouted by clubs further up in the league pyramid. In 2021 he signed for Allsvenskan team Varbergs BoIS, but was not given the chance to make his league debut, and instead went on loan to Gefle IF, a club he had also been considering earlier.

His second stint in Piteå lasted for the 2022 and 2023 seasons, after which Nordh transferred to Superettan team GIF Sundsvall. He was a regular in the first half of the season, but only played 86 minutes combined during the last 10 games. Furthermore, GIF Sundsvall only avoided relegation through playoff, where Nordh scored the decisive 3–2 goal. He moved to IK Brage.

Following 10 assists in 2025, and 7 goals and 6 assists in the first 14 games of 2026, Nordh was wanted by first-tier clubs. One of them was reportedly GAIS. Another was Lillestrøm SK in Norway, and Nordh signed for them in July 2026. His team qualified for the 2026–27 UEFA Europa League league phase.
