= 2023 Superettan =

Superettan
- Season: 2023
- Champions: Västerås SK
- Promoted: Västerås SK; GAIS
- Relegated: Jönköpings Södra IF; AFC Eskilstuna
- Matches: 240
- Goals: 673 (2.8 per match)
- Top goalscorer: Jesper Westermark (17 goals)
- Biggest home win: Utsikten 5–0 GIF Sundsvall (10 June 2023)
- Biggest away win: Gefle 0–6 GAIS (23 September 2023); Trelleborg 0–6 GAIS (8 October 2023)
- Highest scoring: Örebro 5–3 Skövde AIK (17 September 2023)
- Longest winning run: Västerås SK (8 wins)
- Longest unbeaten run: Utsikten (10 games)
- Longest winless run: Skövde AIK (10 games)
- Longest losing run: Örgryte IS (5 games)
- Highest attendance: 13,011; GAIS 0–1 Örgryte IS (1 June 2023)
- Lowest attendance: 104; Utsikten 4–1 IK Brage (14 May 2023)
- Total attendance: 578,443
- Average attendance: 2,582
- All statistics correct as of 11 November 2023.

The 2023 Superettan was the 24th season of Superettan, Sweden's second-tier football division in its current format. It was part of the 2023 Swedish football season and contested by 16 teams.

== Teams ==
A total of 16 teams contest the league. The top two teams qualify directly for promotion to Allsvenskan, the third will enter a play-off for the chance of promotion. The two bottom teams are automatically relegated, while the 13th and 14th placed teams will compete in a play-off to determine whether they are relegated.

The following teams have changed division since the 2022 season:

=== To Superettan ===
Promoted from Ettan

- Gefle IF – Winner Ettan Norra
- GAIS – Winner Ettan Södra

Relegated from Allsvenskan

- Helsingborgs IF
- GIF Sundsvall

=== From Superettan ===
Promoted to Allsvenskan

- IF Brommapojkarna
- Halmstads BK

Relegated to Ettan

- Norrby IF
- Dalkurd FF

=== Stadiums and locations ===
Locations of the 2023 Superettan teams

Team	Location	Stadium	Stadium capacity (Note: According to each club information page at the Swedish Football Association website for Superettan.)
AFC Eskilstuna	Eskilstuna	Tunavallen	7,800
IK Brage	Borlänge	Domnarvsvallen	6,500
GAIS	Gothenburg	Gamla Ullevi	18,416
Gefle IF	Gävle	Gavlevallen	6,500
GIF Sundsvall	Sundsvall	NP3 Arena	8,000
Helsingborgs IF	Helsingborg	Olympia	16,500
Jönköpings Södra IF	Jönköping	Stadsparksvallen	5,500
Landskrona BoIS	Landskrona	Landskrona IP	10,500
Skövde AIK	Skövde	Södermalms IP	4,500
Trelleborgs FF	Trelleborg	Vångavallen	7,000
Utsiktens BK	Gothenburg	Bravida Arena	6,500
Västerås SK	Västerås	Iver Arena	7,000
Örebro SK	Örebro	Behrn Arena	14,400
Örgryte IS	Gothenburg	Gamla Ullevi	18,416
Östers IF	Växjö	Visma Arena	12,000
Östersunds FK	Östersund	Jämtkraft Arena	8,545

== League table ==
Pos	Team	Pld	W	D	L	GF	GA	GD	Pts	Promotion, qualification or relegation
1	Västerås SK (C, P)	30	19	6	5	48	24	+24	63	Promotion to Allsvenskan
2	GAIS (P)	30	17	6	7	61	23	+38	57	Promotion to Allsvenskan
3	Utsiktens BK	30	16	7	7	50	31	+19	55	Qualification for Allsvenskan play-off
4	Östers IF	30	16	6	8	57	35	+22	54	
5	Östersunds FK	30	10	12	8	44	39	+5	42	
6	IK Brage	30	12	5	13	39	42	−3	41	
7	Landskrona BoIS	30	11	6	13	40	49	−9	39	
8	Trelleborgs FF	30	10	9	11	40	52	−12	39	
9	Gefle IF	30	9	10	11	36	45	−9	37	
10	GIF Sundsvall	30	9	8	13	37	53	−16	35	
11	Örebro SK	30	8	10	12	43	45	−2	34	
12	Helsingborgs IF	30	8	9	13	32	37	−5	33	
13	Skövde AIK (O)	30	9	6	15	42	52	−10	33	Qualification for Superettan play-off
14	Örgryte IS (O)	30	8	8	14	33	47	−14	32	Qualification for Superettan play-off
15	Jönköpings Södra IF (R)	30	7	10	13	43	57	−14	31	Relegation to Ettan
16	AFC Eskilstuna (R)	30	7	10	13	28	42	−14	31	Relegation to Ettan

Source: svenskfotboll.se
Rules for classification: 1) Points; 2) Goal difference; 3) Number of goals scored; 4) Head-to-head points; 5) Head-to-head goal difference; 6) Head-to-head away goals scored
(C) Champions; (O) Play-off winners; (P) Promoted; (R) Relegated

=== Superettan play-off ===
The thirteenth and fourteenth-placed teams (Örgryte IS and Skövde AIK) each faced one of the two runners-up from the 2023 Ettan (Falkenbergs FF and Nordic United FC) in two-legged ties for the final two places in the 2024 Superettan.

23 November 2023
19:00

Falkenbergs FF	2–2	Skövde AIK
Aguda 44'; Hintsa 90+7'		Abdulazeez 15'; Vidjeskog 78'

Falcon Alkoholfri Arena, Falkenberg
26 November 2023
14:00

Skövde AIK	3–0	Falkenbergs FF
Tibell 25', 75'; Suljev 42'

Södermalms IP, Skövde

Skövde AIK won 5–2 on aggregate.

23 November 2023
19:00

Nordic United FC	0–1	Örgryte IS
		Christoffersson 78'

Södertälje Fotbollsarena, Södertälje
26 November 2023
16:00

Örgryte IS	1–0	Nordic United FC
Lundberg 18'

Gamla Ullevi, Gothenburg

Örgryte IS won 2–0 on aggregate.

=== Positions by round ===
Team ╲ Round	1	2	3	4	5	6	7	8	9	10	11	12	13	14	15	16	17	18	19	20	21	22	23	24	25	26	27	28	29	30
Västerås SK	2	6	3	3	4	2	2	1	2	3	2	2	2	2	2	2	2	2	2	2	2	2	1	1	1	1	1	1	1	1
GAIS	8	5	2	2	3	3	1	3	3	4	3	3	3	3	4	4	4	3	3	3	4	4	3	3	2	2	2	2	2	2
Utsiktens BK	4	2	4	5	5	5	3	2	1	1	1	1	1	1	1	1	1	1	1	1	1	1	2	2	3	3	3	3	3	3
Östers IF	5	1	1	1	1	1	4	4	4	2	4	5	5	5	3	3	3	4	4	4	3	3	4	4	4	4	4	4	4	4
Östersunds FK	9	9	7	4	2	4	5	5	6	10	11	8	9	7	6	6	5	5	6	6	7	7	8	8	6	6	7	5	5	5
IK Brage	12	15	10	9	9	7	9	9	12	9	10	7	6	6	7	7	10	12	12	10	12	10	9	10	9	7	6	7	7	6
Landskrona BoIS	16	16	11	13	10	9	10	7	8	8	6	6	7	9	10	8	8	11	8	7	6	5	5	5	5	5	6	6	6	7
Trelleborgs FF	15	14	9	12	15	15	13	12	9	11	7	9	10	10	8	10	11	9	10	11	8	9	7	6	8	9	8	8	8	8
Gefle IF	3	4	5	6	8	11	7	8	11	12	13	12	8	8	9	11	7	6	5	5	5	6	6	7	7	8	9	9	9	9
GIF Sundsvall	1	3	6	8	7	8	8	10	7	6	8	10	11	12	12	12	12	13	13	12	13	11	12	12	13	13	11	10	10	10
Örebro SK	11	10	13	14	11	10	11	11	13	14	12	13	13	13	14	14	13	10	11	13	9	8	10	9	10	10	10	11	11	11
Helsingborgs IF	13	13	16	16	14	14	15	15	15	15	15	15	14	11	13	13	15	15	15	15	14	15	14	13	12	12	13	13	12	12
Skövde AIK	14	11	14	15	16	16	16	16	16	16	16	16	16	16	16	16	16	16	16	16	16	16	16	15	16	16	14	14	14	13
Örgryte IS	7	8	12	11	13	13	14	14	10	7	9	11	12	14	15	15	14	14	14	14	15	14	15	16	15	14	15	16	15	14
Jönköpings Södra IF	10	7	8	7	6	6	6	6	5	5	5	4	4	4	5	5	6	7	7	8	10	12	11	11	11	11	12	12	13	15
AFC Eskilstuna	6	12	15	10	12	12	12	13	14	13	14	14	15	15	11	9	9	8	9	9	11	13	13	14	14	15	16	15	16	16

Promotion to Allsvenskan
Allsvenskan play-off
Superettan play-off
Relegation to Ettan

Source: everysport.com

== Results by round ==
Team ╲ Round	1	2	3	4	5	6	7	8	9	10	11	12	13	14	15	16	17	18	19	20	21	22	23	24	25	26	27	28	29	30
AFC Eskilstuna	D	L	L	W	L	D	W	D	D	D	L	L	L	W	W	W	D	D	L	W	L	L	L	L	D	L	L	D	D	W
GAIS	D	W	W	W	L	W	W	L	D	L	W	W	D	D	L	D	D	W	W	W	L	W	W	W	W	W	W	L	W	L
Gefle IF	W	W	L	D	L	L	W	D	L	L	L	W	W	D	D	L	W	W	W	L	W	D	L	D	L	L	D	D	D	D
GIF Sundsvall	W	W	L	L	W	L	D	L	W	W	L	L	L	L	D	D	D	D	L	W	L	W	L	D	D	L	W	W	D	L
Helsingborgs IF	L	L	L	L	W	L	D	L	D	D	D	W	W	W	L	D	L	L	D	L	W	L	W	D	W	L	D	D	W	L
IK Brage	L	L	W	W	D	W	L	D	L	W	L	W	W	L	L	D	L	L	L	W	D	D	W	L	D	W	W	L	L	W
Jönköpings Södra IF	D	D	W	D	W	D	L	W	W	L	D	W	D	W	L	L	L	L	D	L	L	L	W	L	D	L	D	D	L	L
Landskrona BoIS	L	L	W	L	W	W	D	W	L	D	W	L	D	L	L	W	L	L	W	W	W	W	D	L	D	W	L	D	L	L
Skövde AIK	L	D	L	L	D	L	L	L	L	D	W	L	D	L	W	L	L	W	W	L	L	L	W	W	L	W	D	W	D	W
Trelleborgs FF	L	L	W	L	L	L	W	W	W	D	W	L	L	D	W	L	D	D	L	D	W	D	W	W	L	L	W	D	D	D
Utsiktens BK	W	W	L	D	W	D	W	W	W	W	W	W	W	L	W	D	W	W	W	L	D	L	L	L	D	D	W	L	D	W
Västerås SK	W	D	W	W	L	W	D	W	L	D	W	W	W	W	W	W	W	W	L	D	D	D	W	W	W	W	W	W	L	L
Örebro SK	D	D	L	L	W	W	D	L	D	L	W	L	D	D	D	D	D	W	L	D	W	W	L	W	L	L	L	L	W	L
Örgryte IS	D	D	L	D	L	D	D	W	W	W	L	L	L	L	L	D	W	L	D	L	L	W	L	L	W	D	L	L	W	W
Östers IF	W	W	W	W	L	D	L	L	W	W	L	L	D	W	W	W	D	L	W	W	W	D	D	D	L	W	L	W	W	W
Östersunds FK	D	D	W	W	W	D	L	D	L	L	L	W	L	W	D	D	W	D	D	D	D	D	L	W	D	W	L	W	L	W

Source: soccerstats.com
W = Win; D = Draw; L = Lose

== Results ==
Home \ Away	ESK	GAI	GEF	GIF	HEL	BRA	JÖN	LAN	SKÖ	TRE	UTS	VÄS	ÖRE	ÖRG	ÖST	ÖFK
AFC Eskilstuna		0–0	2–1	0–1	0–1	2–1	2–2	0–1	3–0	1–0	1–1	1–2	3–0	1–3	1–1	1–1
GAIS	3–0		1–1	3–3	4–1	3–0	0–1	2–0	3–1	2–1	0–1	0–2	4–0	0–1	1–0	2–1
Gefle IF	2–0	0–6		1–3	1–0	2–0	1–0	3–3	4–1	1–1	1–1	0–3	2–1	0–1	3–2	2–2
GIF Sundsvall	1–1	0–3	2–2		1–1	1–2	3–2	2–0	2–0	1–1	1–0	1–3	2–2	1–0	2–3	0–3
Helsingborgs IF	1–0	2–1	0–0	3–2		2–0	2–2	1–2	0–0	1–3	0–1	0–1	4–1	2–3	0–1	1–0
IK Brage	4–0	0–4	1–1	2–0	1–0		4–0	2–1	3–2	1–1	3–0	1–2	2–1	4–1	1–2	2–1
Jönköpings Södra IF	2–3	0–2	2–1	1–0	2–2	4–1		1–2	2–2	3–1	0–2	2–1	0–0	2–1	2–3	1–1
Landskrona BoIS	1–2	2–1	1–0	2–2	2–1	3–0	1–1		2–0	1–1	1–3	0–1	3–2	1–2	2–2	0–1
Skövde AIK	1–0	0–0	3–1	2–0	1–0	0–0	3–3	4–2		2–3	2–0	0–2	1–2	2–0	1–2	5–1
Trelleborgs FF	2–0	0–6	0–1	3–4	0–0	1–0	2–1	0–3	2–2		0–3	3–2	2–2	2–0	1–3	1–0
Utsiktens BK	1–1	1–2	0–0	5–0	1–1	4–1	2–1	5–1	1–0	2–3		4–0	2–1	2–1	2–1	0–0
Västerås SK	0–0	2–1	1–0	2–0	3–2	0–0	3–1	0–0	4–0	3–0	1–0		3–0	0–0	2–1	0–2
Örebro SK	3–0	0–0	2–0	0–1	1–1	0–2	3–0	4–0	5–3	0–0	5–1	1–1		0–0	1–1	0–0
Örgryte IS	2–2	1–4	3–1	1–0	1–2	1–1	2–2	0–1	1–2	0–2	2–2	1–0	0–3		2–2	2–2
Östers IF	3–0	1–2	1–2	4–0	1–1	1–0	4–0	2–1	2–1	5–2	0–1	2–2	3–0	3–0		0–1
Östersunds FK	1–1	1–1	2–2	1–1	1–0	2–0	3–3	4–1	2–1	2–2	1–2	1–2	4–3	2–1	1–2	

Source: svenskfotboll.se
Legend: Blue = home team win; Yellow = draw; Red = away team win.

== Season statistics ==
=== Top scorers ===
As of 11 November 2023

Rank	Player	Club	Goals
1	(Sweden) Jesper Westermark	Östers IF	17
2	(Sweden) Lucas Hedlund	Utsiktens BK	16
3	(Sweden) Jabir Abdihakim Ali	Västerås SK	14
3	(Sweden) Adam Bergmark Wiberg	Östers IF	14
5	(Sweden) Kalle Holmberg	Örebro SK	13
6	(Sweden) Julius Lindberg	GAIS	11
7	(Turkey) Mervan Çelik	GAIS	10

=== Top assists ===
As of 11 November 2023

Rank	Player	Club	Assists
1	(Sweden) Gustav Lundgren	GAIS	12
2	(Sweden) Erik Andersson	GIF Sundsvall	11
3	(Sweden) Julius Lindberg	GAIS	10
4	(Sweden) Daniel Ask	Västerås SK	9
4	(Brazil) Erick Brendon	Östersunds FK	9
4	(Montenegro) Vladimir Rodić	Östers IF	9
7	(Sweden) Simon Gefvert	Västerås SK	8
7	(Sweden) Simon Johansson	Västerås SK	8
7	(Sweden) Malkolm Moënza	Jönköpings Södra IF	8

=== Hat-tricks ===
Player	For	Against	Result	Date

Notes

^{4} Player scored 4 goals
(H) – Home team
(A) – Away team

=== Discipline ===
==== Player ====
Most yellow cards: 10

- Albin Skoglund (Utsikten)
- Isak Vidjeskog (Skövde)
- Jesper Westermark (Östers)

Most red cards: 2

- Wilhelm Nilsson (Utsikten)
- Alexander Zetterström (Brage)

==== Club ====
- Most yellow cards:
- Most red cards:

== Attendances ==
#	Club	Average	Change %
1	Helsingborgs IF	6,002	-23.5%
2	GAIS	4,828	106.5%
3	Västerås SK	3,783	154.1%
4	Östers IF	3,708	52.6%
5	Örebro SK	3,506	37.3%
6	GIF Sundsvall	3,036	-16.7%
7	Örgryte IS	2,594	36.5%
8	Jönköpings Södra IF	2,528	8.4%
9	Landskrona BoIS	2,364	35.1%
10	Östersunds FK	2,226	46.2%
11	IK Brage	1,725	-17.1%
12	Gefle IF	1,630	35.4%
13	Trelleborgs FF	1,084	9.1%
14	Skövde AIK	1,006	-11.9%
15	AFC Eskilstuna	701	-8.1%
16	Utsikten BK	640	136.0%
