= Superettan =

Swedish second-tier men's football league

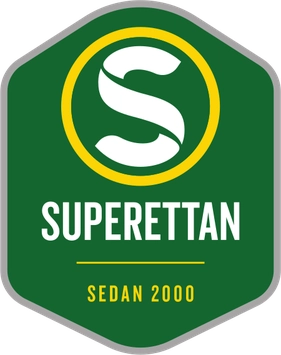
- Founded: 2000; 26 years ago
- Country: Sweden
- Confederation: UEFA
- Number of clubs: 16
- Level on pyramid: 2
- Promotion to: Allsvenskan
- Relegation to: Ettan
- Domestic cup: Svenska Cupen
- Current champions: IFK Norrköping (2026)
- Most championships: Kalmar FF; Östers IF; Mjällby AIF; IF Brommapojkarna; Västerås SK; IFK Norrköping (2 titles)
- Broadcaster: HBO Max
- Website: superettan.se
- Current: 2026 Superettan

Superettan (Swedish pronunciation: [ˈsʉ̂ːpɛrˌɛtːan]; lit. 'the Super First (Division)') is an association football league and the second highest league in the league system of Swedish men's football. Contested by 16 clubs, it operates on a system of promotion and relegation with Allsvenskan and Division 1. Seasons run from April to October, with teams playing 30 matches each, totalling 240 matches in the season.

The league was created in 2000. The second tier of Swedish football had previously consisted of a varying number of regionalized leagues operating under the Division 2 (1924–1986) and Division 1 (1987–1999) names.

== Competition format ==
There are 16 clubs in Superettan. During the course of a season (starting in April and ending in October) each club plays the other twice, once at their home stadium and once at that of their opponents, for a total of 30 games. At the end of each season the two lowest placed teams are relegated to Division 1 and the two winning teams from the two Division 1 leagues are promoted in their place while the third and fourth lowest teams in Superettan play a promotion/relegation play-off against the two-second placed teams in Division 1. The top two teams in Superettan are promoted to Allsvenskan and the two lowest placed teams from Allsvenskan are relegated in their place. The third placed team in Superettan plays a promotion/relegation play-off against the third lowest team in Allsvenskan.

== Television ==
The Swiss corporation Kentaro has owned the TV rights for Superettan since 2006. Through license agreements with the media company TV4 Group matches are aired on TV4 Sport who will broadcast a total of 90 matches in 2013 with the remaining 150 games available as online pay per view. This license agreement was valid from 2011 to 2015.

On 24 March 2017, it was announced that the Discovery-owned broadcaster Eurosport will be the new domestic broadcaster for both SEF competitions (Allsvenskan and Superettan) effectively from 2020 until 2025.

== Current clubs (2024 season) ==
Club	Position in 2023	First season	First season of current spell	Number of seasons in Superettan	Number of seasons in second tier
IK Brage	6th	2000	2018	14	57.5
Degerfors IF	15th Allsvenskan	2005	2020	15	42
Gefle IF	9th	2001	2023	7	49.5
GIF Sundsvall	10th	2006	2023	10	44
Helsingborgs IF	12th	2017	2023	4	25
IK Oddevold	1st Div. 1 Södra	2024	2024	0	18
Landskrona BoIS	7th	2000	2021	15	56
Sandvikens IF	1st Div. 1 Norra	2024	2024	0	35.5
Skövde AIK	13th	2022	2022	3	3
Trelleborgs FF	8th	2002	2019	12	23.5
Utsiktens BK	3rd	2015	2022	3	3
Varbergs BoIS	16th Allsvenskan	2006	2024	8	20
Örebro SK	11th	2013	2022	5	32
Örgryte IS	14th	2007	2016	12	36.5
Östers IF	4th	2000	2017	17	27
Östersunds FK	5th	2013	2022	5	5

=== Stadia and locations ===
Location of the 2023 Superettan teams

Team	Location	Stadium	Turf^{1}	Stadium capacity^{1}
AFC Eskilstuna	Eskilstuna	Tunavallen	Artificial	7,800
IK Brage	Borlänge	Domnarvsvallen	Artificial	6,500
GAIS	Gothenburg	Gamla Ullevi	Natural	18,416
Gefle IF	Gävle	Gavlevallen	Artificial	6,500
GIF Sundsvall	Sundsvall	NP3 Arena	Artificial	7,700
Helsingborgs IF	Helsingborg	Olympia	Natural	16,500
Jönköpings Södra IF	Jönköping	Stadsparksvallen	Natural	5,500
Landskrona BoIS	Landskrona	Landskrona IP	Artificial	10,500
Skövde AIK	Skövde	Södermalms IP	Natural	4,500
Trelleborgs FF	Trelleborg	Vångavallen	Natural	7,000
Utsiktens BK	Gothenburg	Ruddalens IP	Natural	5,000
Västerås SK	Västerås	Iver Arena	Artificial	7,044
Örebro SK	Örebro	Behrn Arena	Artificial	14,400
Östers IF	Växjö	Visma Arena	Natural	12,000
Örgryte IS	Gothenburg	Gamla Ullevi	Natural	18,416
Östersunds FK	Östersund	Jämtkraft Arena	Artificial	8,545

- ^{1} Correct as of end of 2019 season

== Managers ==
The current managers in Superettan are:

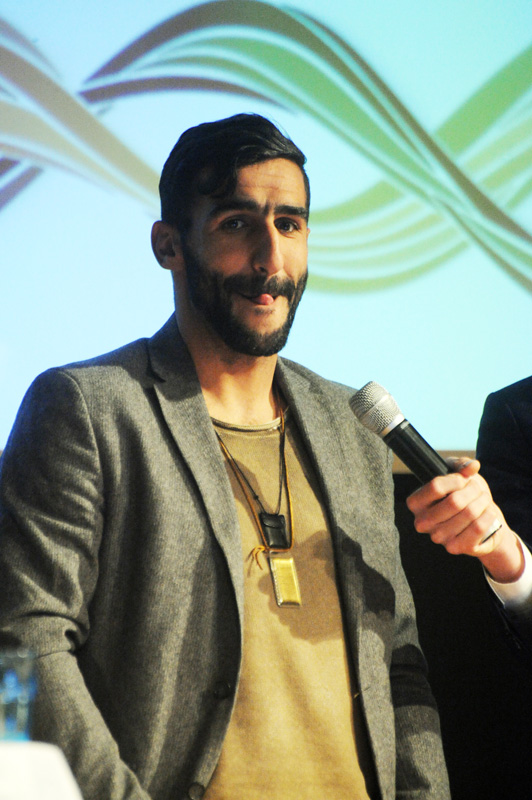
Mak Lind has been the manager of Norrby IF since December 2017.

	Name	Club	Appointed
(Sweden)	Klebér Saarenpää	IK Brage	16 November 2017
(Lebanon)	Mak Lind	Norrby IF	15 December 2017
(Sweden)	Billy Magnusson	Landskrona BoIS	November 2018
(Sweden)	Robin Asterhed	IFK Värnamo	January 2019
(Sweden)	Denis Velić	Östers IF	29 July 2019
(Sweden)	Kristian Haynes	Trelleborgs FF	October 2019
(Sweden)	Stefan Jacobsson	GAIS	November 2019
(Sweden)	Henrik Åhnstrand	GIF Sundsvall	December 2019
(Sweden)	Özcan Melkemichel	AFC Eskilstuna	December 2019
(Greece)	Giannis Christopoulos	Akropolis IF	January 2020
(Sweden)	Jörgen Lennartsson	Helsingborgs IF	December 2020
(Sweden)	Dane Ivarsson	Örgryte IS	January 2021
(Sweden)	Patrik Jildefalk	Jönköpings Södra IF	January 2021
(Sweden)	Tobias Tuvesson	Falkenbergs FF	May 2021
(Sweden)	Robert Björknesjö; George Moussally	Vasalunds IF	July 2021
(Sweden)	Kalle Karlsson	Västerås SK	August 2021

== Statistics ==
=== Previous winners ===
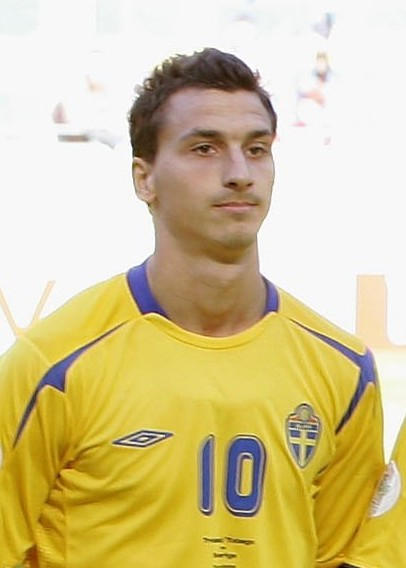
Zlatan Ibrahimović scored 12 goals in the inaugural Superettan season to help Malmö FF get promoted.

Season	Winner	Runner-up	Promotion Playoffs
2000	Djurgårdens IF	Malmö FF	Mjällby AIF
2001	Kalmar FF	Landskrona BoIS	Mjällby AIF
2002	Östers IF	Enköpings SK	Västra Frölunda IF
2003	Kalmar FF	Trelleborgs FF	BK Häcken
2004	BK Häcken	Gefle IF	Assyriska FF ^{(promoted)}
2005	AIK	Östers IF	GAIS ^{(promoted)}
2006	Trelleborgs FF	Örebro SK	IF Brommapojkarna ^{(promoted)}
2007	IFK Norrköping	Ljungskile SK	GIF Sundsvall ^{(promoted)}
2008	Örgryte IS	BK Häcken	IF Brommapojkarna ^{(promoted)}
2009	Mjällby AIF	Åtvidabergs FF	Assyriska FF
2010	Syrianska FC	IFK Norrköping	GIF Sundsvall
2011	Åtvidabergs FF	GIF Sundsvall	Ängelholms FF
2012	Östers IF	IF Brommapojkarna	Halmstads BK ^{(promoted)}
2013	Falkenbergs FF	Örebro SK	GIF Sundsvall
2014	Hammarby IF	GIF Sundsvall	Ljungskile SK
2015	Jönköpings Södra IF	Östersunds FK	IK Sirius
2016	IK Sirius	AFC United	Halmstads BK ^{(promoted)}
2017	IF Brommapojkarna	Dalkurd FF	Trelleborgs FF ^{(promoted)}
2018	Helsingborgs IF	Falkenbergs FF	AFC Eskilstuna ^{(promoted)}
2019	Mjällby AIF	Varbergs BoIS	IK Brage
2020	Halmstads BK	Degerfors IF	Jönköpings Södra IF
2021	IFK Värnamo	GIF Sundsvall	Helsingborgs IF ^{(promoted)}
2022	IF Brommapojkarna	Halmstads BK	Östers IF
2023	Västerås SK	GAIS	Utsiktens BK
2024	Degerfors IF	Östers IF	Landskrona BoIS
2025	Västerås SK	Kalmar FF	Örgryte IS^{(promoted)}
2026	IFK Norrköping	Falkenbergs FF	To be decided

=== Top goalscorers ===
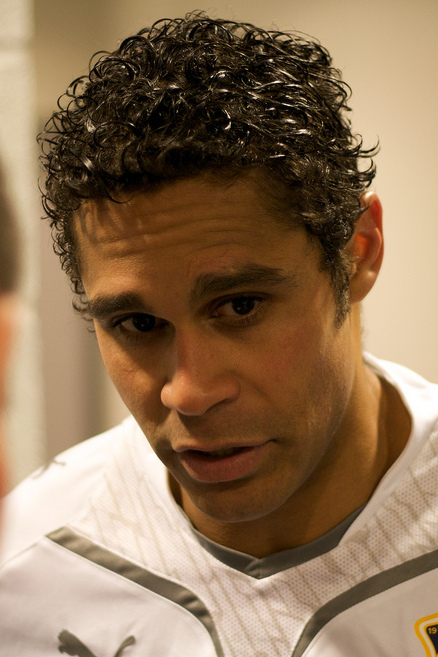
2001 top scorer Daniel Nannskog also went on to become top scorer in Adeccoligaen and Tippeligaen.

Season	Player	Team	Goals
2000	(Sweden) Fredrik Gärdeman	Åtvidabergs FF	14
2001	(Sweden) Daniel Nannskog	Landskrona BoIS	21
2002	(Sweden) Ludwig Ernstsson	Östers IF	18
2003	(Sweden) Göran Marklund	FC Café Opera	23
2004	(Sweden) Stefan Bärlin	Västerås SK	23
2005	(Brazil) Bruno Santos	IFK Norrköping	16
2006	(Sweden) Olof Guterstam (Sweden) Stefan Rodevåg	IF Brommapojkarna; Falkenbergs FF	17
2007	(Iceland) Gardar Gunnlaugsson	IFK Norrköping	18
2008	(Sweden) Jonas Henriksson	BK Häcken	19
2009	(Sweden) Marcus Ekenberg (Sweden) Mattias Adelstam	Mjällby AIF; Ängelholms FF	19
2010	(Sweden) Linus Hallenius	Hammarby IF	18
2011	(Sweden) Branimir Hrgota	Jönköpings Södra IF	18
2012	(Sweden) Pablo Piñones Arce	IF Brommapojkarna	18
2013	(Sweden) Victor Sköld	Falkenbergs FF	20
2014	(Sweden) Kennedy Bakircioglu	Hammarby IF	17
2015	(Sweden) Fredrik Olsson	Jönköpings Södra IF	17
2016	(Sweden) Shkodran Maholli	Åtvidabergs FF	15
2017	(Sweden) Richard Yarsuvat	Dalkurd FF	17
2018	(Iceland) Andri Rúnar Bjarnason	Helsingborgs IF	16
2019	(Sweden) Erik Björndahl	Degerfors IF	20
2020	(Sweden) Pontus Engblom	GIF Sundsvall	20
2021	(Sweden) Ajdin Zeljkovic	Örgryte IS	18
2022	(Sweden) Viktor Granath	Västerås SK	24
2023	(Sweden) Jesper Westermark	Östers IF	17
2024	(Sweden) Assad Al Hamlawi (Sweden) Kalle Holmberg (Sweden) Dijan Vukojević	IK Oddevold; Örebro SK; Degerfors IF	14
2025	(Iraq) Amar Muhsin	IK Brage	21
2026	(Sweden) Christoffer Nyman (Denmark) Christian Wagner	IFK Norrköping; Sandvikens IF	19

=== Top assists ===
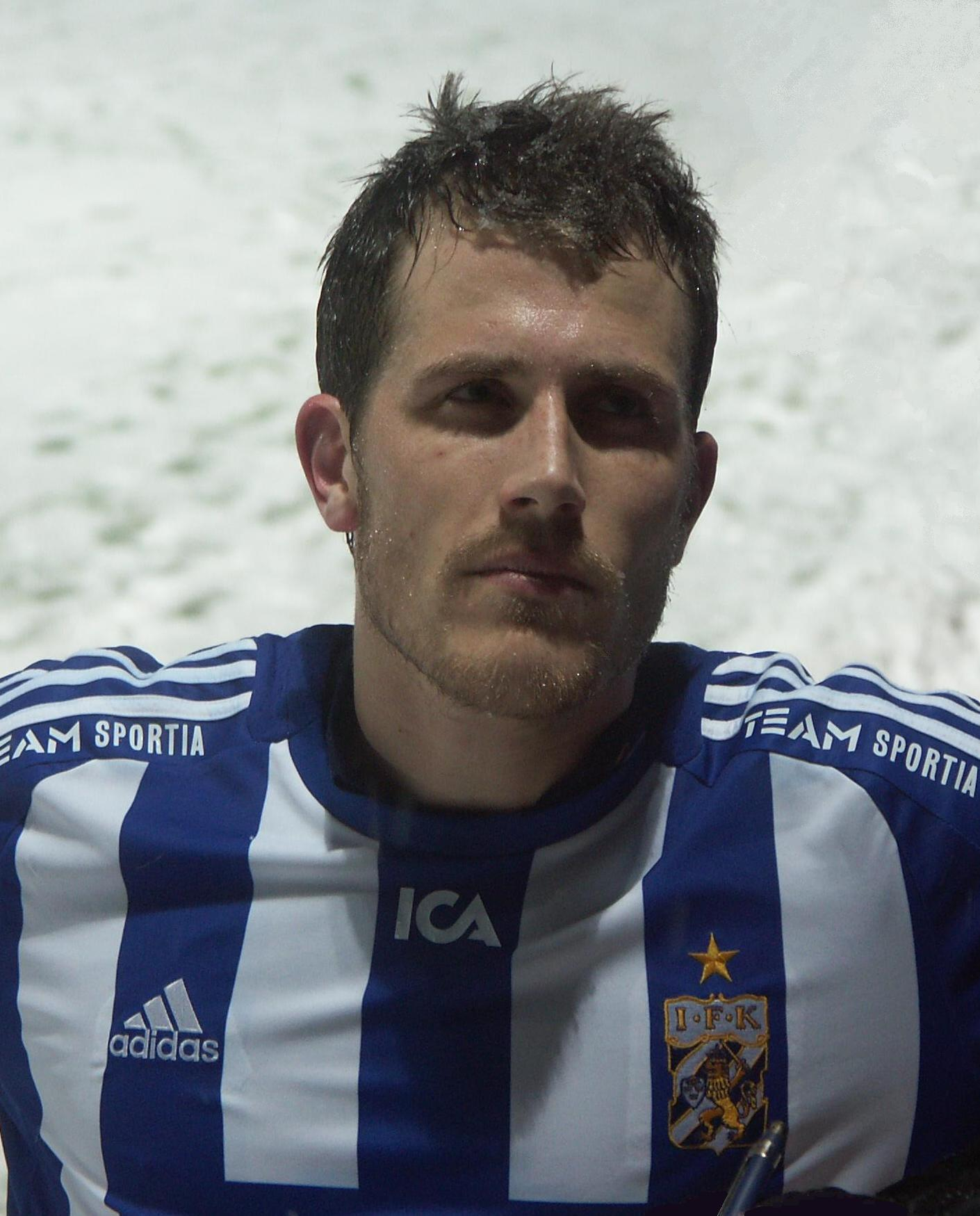
Tobias Hysén went on to make 34 appearances for the Sweden national team.

Season	Player	Team	Assists
2001	(Sweden) Pelle Andersson	IF Sylvia	11
2002	(Sweden) Olle Kullinger	Enköpings SK	11
2003	(Sweden) Tobias Hysén	BK Häcken	15
2004	(Sweden) Daniel Westlin	Gefle IF	12
2005	(Sweden) Daniel Nicklasson	GAIS	10
2006	(Norway) Eirik Dybendal (Sweden) Martin Smedberg-Dalence	IFK Norrköping; Ljungskile SK	11
2007	(Norway) Eirik Dybendal	IFK Norrköping	16
2008	(Czech Republic) Pavel Zavadil	Örgryte IS	17
2009	(Sweden) Marcus Ekenberg (Sweden) Martin Smedberg-Dalence	Mjällby AIF; Ljungskile SK	11
2010	(Brazil) Daniel Bamberg	IFK Norrköping	15
2011	(Sweden) Tobias Nilsson	Falkenbergs FF	12
2012	(Sweden) Denis Velić	Östers IF	11
2013	(Sweden) Niclas Eliasson	Falkenbergs FF	11
2014	(Sweden) Robert Gojani	Jönköpings Södra IF	11
2015	(Sweden) Dženis Kozica	IFK Värnamo	11
2016	(Sweden) Johan Svahn	IFK Värnamo	11
2017	(Sweden) Petar Petrović	IFK Värnamo	12
2018	(Sweden) Diego Montiel	Örgryte IS	14
2019	(Sweden) Gustav Ludwigson	Örgryte IS	9
2020	(Sweden) Samuel Kroon (Sweden) Wilhelm Loeper	Halmstads BK; AFC Eskilstuna	11
2021	(Sweden) Wilhelm Loeper	Helsingborgs IF	12
2022	(Sweden) Oscar Pettersson	IF Brommapojkarna	12
2023	(Sweden) Gustav Lundgren	GAIS	12
2024	(Sweden) Adam Bergmark Wiberg	Östers IF	13
2025	(Sweden) Isak Dahlqvist	Örgryte IS	12
2026	(Sweden) Noel Sernelius	IFK Norrköping	18

=== Top goalkeepers ===
(Minimum of 10 games played)

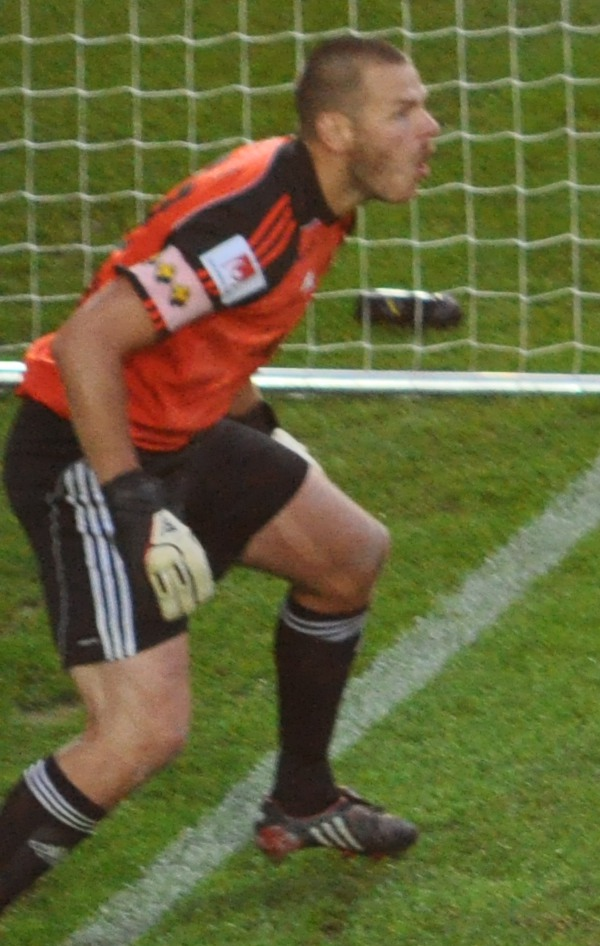
Daniel Örlund is the one of only two keepers who has had the top save percentage in two separate seasons.

Season	Goalkeeper	Club	GP	GA	SV%	CS
2004	(Sweden) Mattias Hugosson	Gefle IF	25	17	85	14
2004	(Sweden) Daniel Örlund	FC Café Opera	25	25	85	7
2005	(Sweden) Daniel Örlund	AIK	29	25	80	13
2006	(Sweden) Fredrik Persson	Trelleborgs FF	29	13	89	17
2007	(Sweden) Lee Baxter	Landskrona BoIS	12	12	84	3
2008	(Sweden) Kristoffer Nordfeldt	IF Brommapojkarna	29	27	82	12
2009	(Sweden) Mattias Asper	Mjällby AIF	30	19	87	15
2010	(Jamaica) Dwayne Miller	Syrianska FC	21	14	82	13
2011	(Sweden) Ivo Vazgeč	Landskrona BoIS; Jönköping Södra	25	29	80	7
2012	(Sweden) Zlatan Azinović	Trelleborgs FF	12	19	78	1
2013	(Sweden) Peter Abrahamsson	Örgryte IS	26	31	82	10
2013	(Sweden) Otto Martler	Falkenbergs FF	28	28	82	14
2014	(United States) Alex Horwath	Ljungskile SK	30	25	83	14
2015	(Jamaica) Dwayne Miller	Syrianska FC	13	11	79	6
2016	(United States) Josh Wicks	AFC United	29	16	86	16
2017	(Sweden) Pär Hansson	Helsingborgs IF	15	15	77	6
2017	(Sweden) Damir Mehić	GAIS	29	37	77	9
2018–2026	No data available					

=== Attendance ===
Superettan average attendance
Year	Average spectators/match
2000	2,066
2001	1,744
2002	1,391
2003	1,672
2004	1,826
2005	3,091
2006	2,105
2007	2,450
2008	1,557
2009	1,880
2010	2,572
2011	2,423
2012	2,456
2013	2,957
2014	3,267
2015	1,623
2016	1,727
2017	2,074
2018	2,278
2019	1,632

Superettan had an average attendance of 1,632 during its most recent season (2019). The highest attendance ever recorded at a Superettan match is 31,074 (Hammarby vs Ljungskile in 2014).

The league's best season attendance-wise was 2014 when Hammarby's average attendance reached a level that was extraordinary for Superettan.

Hammarby IF and Helsingborgs IF have had five seasons each where they were the team with the highest average home attendance, the most of any teams.

==== Club attendance ====
Club with best average home attendance
Season	Club	Spectators	Ref
2004	IFK Norrköping	4,354	
2005	AIK	11,872	
2006	Örebro SK	5,359	
2007	IFK Norrköping	7,354	
2008	Assyriska FF	2,863	
2009	IFK Norrköping	4,306	
2010	Hammarby IF	6,864	
2011	Hammarby IF	7,953	
2012	Hammarby IF	8,463	
2013	Hammarby IF	12,101	
2014	Hammarby IF	20,451	
2015	Östersunds FK	3,857	
2016	GAIS	3,315	
2017	Helsingborgs IF	6,758	
2018	Helsingborgs IF	8,013	
2019	GAIS	2,854	
2020 2021	No data available		
2022	Halmstads BK	3,370	
2023	Helsingborgs IF	6,038	
2024	Helsingborgs IF	7,299	
2025	Helsingborgs IF	6,945	
2026	IFK Norrköping	7,078	

== See also ==
- Sports attendances
- Allsvenskan
