= Taylor Silverholt =

Swedish footballer

Personal information
- Full name: Taylor Phoenix Silverholt
- Date of birth: 4 April 2001 (age 25)
- Height: 1.80 m (5 ft 11 in)
- Position: Forward

Team information
- Current team: IF Elfsborg
- Number: 11

Youth career
- Astrio BK
- –2017: Halmstads BK

Senior career*
Years	Team	Apps	(Gls)
2018–2023	Mjällby AIF	44	(7)
2022	→ Falkenbergs FF (loan)	16	(6)
2023	→ Jönköpings Södra IF (loan)	29	(8)
2024	Helsingborgs IF	30	(13)
2025–	IF Elfsborg	33	(7)

International career^{‡}
2018	Sweden U17	3	(1)
- * Club domestic league appearances and goals as of 8 July 2026 ‡ National team caps and goals as of 27 March 2024

Taylor Silverholt (born 4 April 2001) is a Swedish footballer who plays for IF Elfsborg.

== Club career ==
Silverholt signed for Helsingborgs IF on 19 December 2023 on a three-year long contract. On 3 March 2025, Silverholt was signed by IF Elfsborg on a four-year contract.

== International career ==
Silverholt has represented Sweden at the U17-level.
