= Utsiktens BK =

Swedish football club

- Full name: Utsiktens Bollklubb
- Nickname: Kiken
- Short name: UBK
- Founded: 1935; 91 years ago
- Ground: Bravida Arena, Gothenburg
- Capacity: 6,300
- Chairman: Björn Jarkvist
- Head coach: Bosko Orovic
- League: Ettan
- 2025: Superettan, 13th (relegated)
Home colours	Away colours

Utsiktens BK is a Swedish football club located in Västra Frölunda, near Gothenburg.

== Background ==
Since their foundation in 1935 Utsiktens BK has participated mainly in the middle and lower divisions of the Swedish football league system. Utsikten got its name (English: "The View") after a tower in Slottsskogen, which also can be seen in the crest. The club currently plays in Superettan which is the second tier of Swedish football. They play their home matches at the Ruddalens IP in Västra Frölunda, Gothenburg. Utsiktens BK are affiliated to the Göteborgs Fotbollförbund.

== Players ==
=== First-team squad ===
As of 1 September 2026

Note: Flags indicate national team as defined under FIFA eligibility rules; some limited exceptions apply. Players may hold more than one non-FIFA nationality.

No.	Pos.	Nation	Player
1	GK	SWE	Elton Levin
2	DF	SWE	Daniel Hermansson
3	DF	USA	Arvid Lindquist
4	DF	SWE	Samir Bosnic
5	DF	SWE	Mohib Khalaf
6	DF	SWE	Kasper Berndtsson
7	FW	SWE	Victor Andersson
8	DF	SWE	Felix Wennergrund
9	FW	SWE	Vilhelm Gunnarsson
10	MF	SWE	Enzo Andrén
12	MF	SWE	Wiggo Hjort
14	DF	SWE	Carl Juhlin
16	MF	SWE	Elias Risp

No.	Pos.	Nation	Player
17	DF	SWE	Pontus Olsson
18	FW	SWE	Simon Sjöholm (on loan from GAIS)
19	MF	SWE	Melvin Koliqi
20	FW	SWE	Björn Lind
21	FW	SWE	Alfredo Steiner
22	DF	SWE	David Gustafsson (on loan from Varbergs BoIS)
23	DF	BIH	Edvin Hadžić
25	MF	SWE	Oliver Ball
26	FW	SWE	Daniel Bengtsson (on loan from GAIS)
27	MF	SWE	Teo Sellstedt
29	GK	SWE	Linus Dahlgren
31	GK	SWE	Joel Nöller

=== Out on loan ===
Note: Flags indicate national team as defined under FIFA eligibility rules; some limited exceptions apply. Players may hold more than one non-FIFA nationality.

No.	Pos.	Nation	Player

== Season to season ==
Season	Level	Division	Section	Position	Movements
1999	Tier 6	Division 5	Göteborg B	4th	
2000	Tier 6	Division 5	Göteborg B	1st	Promoted
2001	Tier 5	Division 4	Göteborg B	4th	
2002	Tier 5	Division 4	Göteborg B	4th	
2003	Tier 5	Division 4	Göteborg B	5th	
2004	Tier 5	Division 4	Göteborg B	4th	
2005	Tier 5	Division 4	Göteborg B	4th	
2006 *	Tier 6	Division 4	Göteborg B	1st	Promoted
2007	Tier 5	Division 3	Nordvästra Götaland	1st	Promoted
2008	Tier 4	Division 2	Västra Götaland	5th	
2009	Tier 4	Division 2	Västra Götaland	4th	
2010	Tier 4	Division 2	Västra Götaland	4th	
2011	Tier 4	Division 2	Västra Götaland	1st	Promoted
2012	Tier 3	Division 1	Södra	10th	
2013	Tier 3	Division 1	Södra	5th	
2014	Tier 3	Division 1	Södra	1st	Promoted
2015	Tier 2	Superettan		15th	Relegated
2016	Tier 3	Division 1	Södra	4th	
2017	Tier 3	Division 1	Södra	3rd	
2018	Tier 3	Division 1	Södra	8th	
2019	Tier 3	Division 1	Södra	3rd	
2020	Tier 3	Division 1	Södra	3rd	
2021	Tier 3	Division 1	Södra	1st	Promoted
2022	Tier 2	Superettan		11th	
2023	Tier 2	Superettan		3rd	Promotion Playoffs
2024	Tier 2	Superettan		9th	
2025	Tier 2	Superettan		13th	Relegated

* League restructuring in 2006 resulted in a new division being created at Tier 3 and subsequent divisions dropping a level.

== Attendances ==
In recent seasons Utsiktens BK have had the following average attendances:

Season	Average attendance	Division / Section	Level
2006	?	Div 4 Göteborg B	Tier 6
2007	72	Div 3 Nordvästra Götaland	Tier 5
2008	105	Div 2 Västra Götaland	Tier 4
2009	122	Div 2 Västra Götaland	Tier 4
2010	108	Div 2 Västra Götaland	Tier 4
2011	167	Div 2 Västra Götaland	Tier 4
2012	339	Div 1 Södra	Tier 3
2013	148	Div 1 Södra	Tier 3
2014	408	Div 1 Södra	Tier 3
2015	409	Superettan	Tier 2
2016	122	Div 1 Södra	Tier 3
2017	168	Div 1 Södra	Tier 3

* Attendances are provided in the Publikliga sections of the Svenska Fotbollförbundet website.

== Achievements ==
=== League ===
- Division 1 Södra:
  - Winners (2): 2014, 2021
