= Scanian derbies =

Football rivalries in Scania, Sweden

Location of the Scanian clubs. Red: Allsvenskan; Yellow: Superettan; Blue: Division 1;

A Scanian derby (Swedish: Skånederby) is the name given to any fixture between football clubs in Scania, the southernmost county and traditional province of Sweden. The most high-profile fixture in the region is the rivalry between Helsingborgs IF and Malmö FF. Historically, the rivalry between the two clubs and Landskrona BoIS is also well known. Additional Scanian football clubs that are playing in the upper three tiers of Swedish football are BK Olympic, IFK Malmö, Trelleborgs FF, Lunds BK, Torns IF and Ängelholms FF. Two cities have more than one club in the top three tiers: Malmö with MFF, BK Olympic and IFK Malmö, and Lund with Lunds BK and Torns IF.

== Teams in Scania ==
As of the 2024 season, eight clubs in the upper three tiers of Swedish football are based in the Scania area, as follows:

Division	Team(s)
Allsvenskan (tier 1)	Malmö FF
Superettan (tier 2)	Helsingborgs IF, Landskrona BoIS, Trelleborgs FF
Division 1 (tier 3)	Ariana FC, BK Olympic, Eskilsminne IF, FC Rosengård 1917, Lunds BK, Torns IF, Ängelholms FF

Additionally, FBK Balkan, Eslövs BK, Hittarps IK, IFK Hässleholm, Hässleholms IF, Höganäs BK, Kristianstad FC, Nosaby IF and Österlen FF participates in the fourth tier.

=== Number of Allsvenskan seasons ===
Seven clubs from Scania have played in the highest Swedish league. Three clubs from the city of Helsingborg (Helsingborgs IF, Råå IF and Stattena IF), two clubs from Malmö (Malmö FF and IFK Malmö), and one club each from Landskrona (Landskrona BoIS) and Trelleborg (Trelleborgs FF).

Seasons	Team	Years
87	Malmö FF	1931/32–1933/34, 1936/37–1999, 2001–present
69	Helsingborgs IF	1924/25–1934/35, 1937/38–1968, 1993–2016, 2019–2020, 2022
34	Landskrona BoIS	1924/25–1932/33, 1934/35–1941/42, 1944/45, 1948/49, 1971–1980, 1994, 2002–2005
18	Trelleborgs FF	1985, 1992–2001, 2004, 2007–2011, 2018
13	IFK Malmö	1924/25–1925/26, 1928/29–1931/32, 1952/53, 1956/57–1962
2	Råå IF; Stattena IF	1950/51–1951/52; 1927/28, 1929/30

== Attendances in the 21st century ==
Top 10 attendances for Scanian derbies during the 21st century:

Season	Team	Result	Attendance	Arena
Allsvenskan 2003	Malmö FF vs. Helsingborgs IF	5–0	27,477	Malmö Stadion
Allsvenskan 2002	Malmö FF vs. Landskrona BoIS	2–1	24,570	Malmö Stadion
Allsvenskan 2002	Malmö FF vs. Helsingborgs IF	0–2	24,061	Malmö Stadion
Allsvenskan 2010	Malmö FF vs. Helsingborgs IF	2–0	23,743	Stadion
Allsvenskan 2013	Malmö FF vs. Helsingborgs IF	1–1	23,730	Stadion
Allsvenskan 2012	Malmö FF vs. Helsingborgs IF	3–0	23,638	Stadion
Allsvenskan 2011	Malmö FF vs. Helsingborgs IF	0–3	23,612	Stadion
Allsvenskan 2006	Malmö FF vs. Helsingborgs IF	3–1	23,571	Malmö Stadion
Allsvenskan 2003	Malmö FF vs. Landskrona BoIS	2–2	23,081	Malmö Stadion
Allsvenskan 2004	Malmö FF vs. Helsingborgs IF	1–1	22,920	Malmö Stadion

* Attendances are provided in the Publikliga sections of the Svenska Fotbollförbundet website.
