= Kalle Holmberg =

Swedish footballer

Personal information
- Full name: Karl Albin Elis Holmberg
- Date of birth: 3 March 1993 (age 33)
- Place of birth: Örebro, Sweden
- Height: 1.85 m (6 ft 1 in)
- Position: Forward

Team information
- Current team: Örebro SK
- Number: 17

Youth career
- Rynninge IK

Senior career*
Years	Team	Apps	(Gls)
2008–2010	Karlslunds IF	23	(3)
2009	→ Örebro SK Ungdom (loan)	18	(2)
2011–2016	Örebro SK	121	(24)
2016–2019	IFK Norrköping	95	(31)
2020–2022	Djurgårdens IF	68	(13)
2023	Hamrun Spartans	9	(0)
2023–	Örebro SK	105	(42)

International career^{‡}
2009–2010	Sweden U17	10	(1)
2011–2012	Sweden U19	11	(4)
2012	Sweden U21	1	(0)
2018–2019	Sweden	4	(1)
- * Club domestic league appearances and goals as of 12 November 2026 ‡ National team caps and goals as of 11 January 2019

Karl Albin Elis "Kalle" Holmberg (born 3 March 1993) is a Swedish professional footballer who plays as a forward for Örebro SK. He was the topscorer during the 2017 Allsvenskan season, which earned him a call-up to the Sweden national team.

== Career statistics ==
=== Club ===
As of match played on 3 March 2018

Appearances and goals by club, season and competition
Club	Season	League			National cup		League cup		Other		Total	
Club	Season	Division	Apps	Goals	Apps	Goals	Apps	Goals	Apps	Goals	Apps	Goals
Örebro	2011	Allsvenskan	1	0	0	0	—		—		1	0
Örebro	2012	Allsvenskan	25	2	1	0	—		—		26	2
Örebro	2013	Superettan	30	10	3	0	—		—		33	10
Örebro	2014	Allsvenskan	21	5	1	1	—		—		22	6
Örebro	2015	Allsvenskan	30	4	7	2	—		—		37	6
Örebro	2016	Allsvenskan	14	3	1	1	—		—		15	4
Örebro	Total		121	24	13	4	0	0	0	0	134	28
Norrköping	2016	Allsvenskan	12	4	1	1	—		—		13	5
Norrköping	2017	Allsvenskan	30	14	7	9	—		3	3	40	26
Norrköping	2018	Allsvenskan	0	0	3	1	—		—		3	1
Norrköping	Total		42	18	11	11	0	0	3	3	56	32
Career total			163	42	24	15	0	0	3	3	190	60

=== International ===
Scores and results list Sweden's goal tally first, score column indicates score after each Holmberg goal.

List of international goals scored by Kalle Holmberg
No.	Date	Venue	Opponent	Score	Result	Competition
1	7 January 2018	Zayed Sports City Stadium, Abu Dhabi, United Arab Emirates	Estonia	1–1	1–1	Friendly

== Honours ==
Individual

- Allsvenskan top scorer: 2017 (shared with Magnus Eriksson)
- Superettan top scorer: 2024 (shared with Assad Al Hamlawi and Dijan Vukojević)
