= IK Oddevold =

Swedish football club

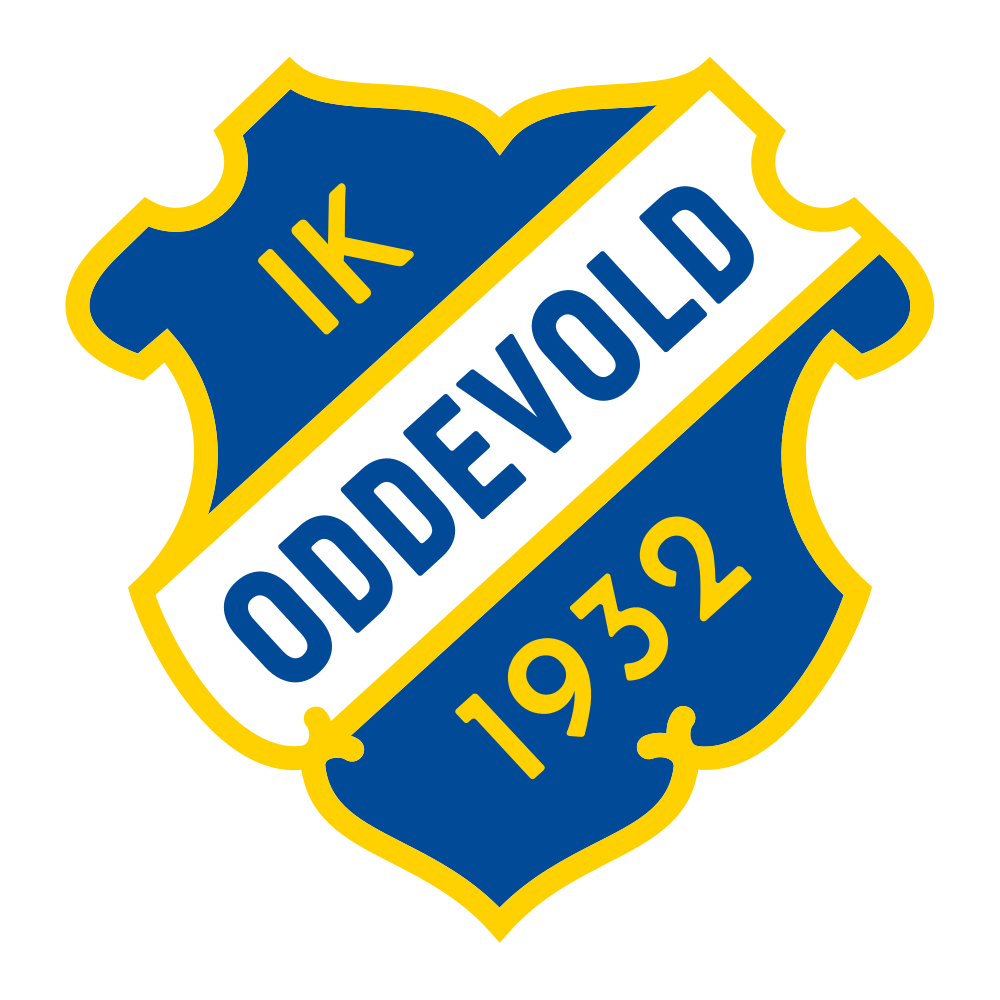
- Full name: Idrottsklubben Oddevold
- Founded: 1932
- Ground: Rimnersvallen, Uddevalla
- Capacity: 4,000
- Chairman: Bengt Bäckman
- Head Coach: Rikard Nilsson
- League: Superettan
- 2025: 4th
- Website: http://www.oddevold.se
Home colours	Away colours

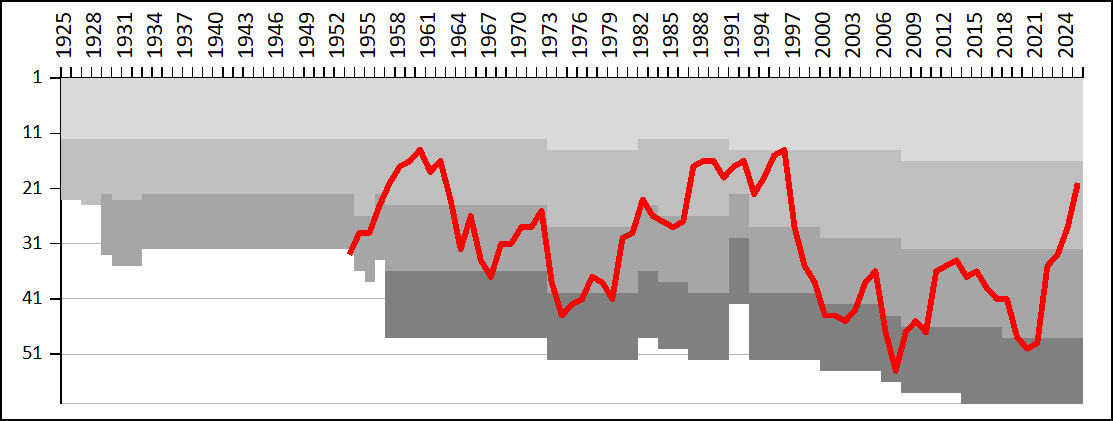
A chart showing the progress of IK Oddevold through the swedish football league system. The different shades of gray represent league divisions.

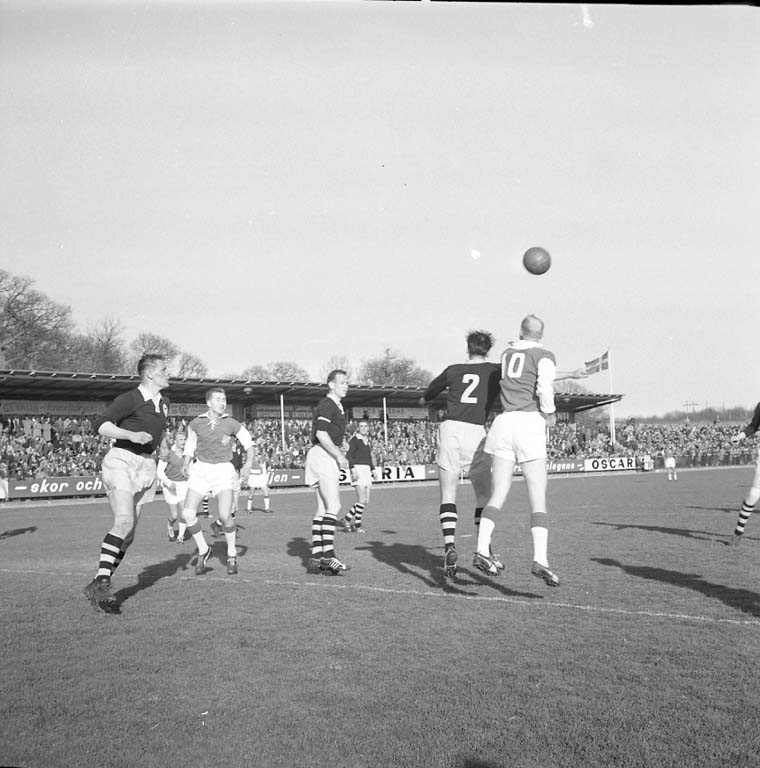
Oddevold playing against Husqvarna FF in 1961.

IK Oddevold is a Swedish football club located in Uddevalla. The club, formed on 3 July 1932, currently plays in Sweden's second-flight league, Superettan. They play most of their home games at Rimnersvallen and they also have a newly built training facility called Thordéngården where they play most of their friendly games.

The name "Oddevold" is an older form of Uddevalla. Formerly, Uddevalla belonged to Norway, and its name today comes from the original Norwegian Oddevald, which later turned into Oddevold.

== Season to season ==
Season	Level	Division	Section	Position	Movements
1993	Tier 2	Division 1	Södra	8th	
1994	Tier 2	Division 1	Södra	5th	
1995	Tier 2	Division 1	Södra	1st	Promoted
1996	Tier 1	Allsvenskan		14th	Relegated
1997	Tier 2	Division 1	Södra	14th	Relegated
1998	Tier 3	Division 2	Västra Götaland	7th	
1999	Tier 3	Division 2	Västra Götaland	10th	Relegated
2000	Tier 4	Division 3	Nordvästra Götaland	2nd	Promotion Playoffs
2001	Tier 4	Division 3	Nordvästra Götaland	2nd	Promotion Playoffs
2002	Tier 4	Division 3	Nordvästra Götaland	3rd	
2003	Tier 4	Division 3	Nordvästra Götaland	1st	Promoted
2004	Tier 3	Division 2	Västra Götaland	8th	
2005	Tier 3	Division 2	Västra Götaland	6th	
2006*	Tier 4	Division 2	Västra Götaland	3rd	
2007	Tier 4	Division 2	Västra Götaland	10th	Relegation Playoffs
2008	Tier 4	Division 2	Västra Götaland	1st	Promoted
2009	Tier 3	Division 1	Södra	13th	Relegated
2010	Tier 4	Division 2	Västra Götaland	1st	Promoted
2011	Tier 3	Division 1	Södra	4th	
2012	Tier 3	Division 1	Södra	3rd	
2013	Tier 3	Division 1	Södra	2nd	Promotion Playoffs
2014	Tier 3	Division 1	Södra	5th	
2015	Tier 3	Division 1	Södra	4th	
2016	Tier 3	Division 1	Södra	7th	
2017	Tier 3	Division 1	Södra	9th	
2018	Tier 3	Division 1	Södra	9th	
2019	Tier 3	Division 1	Södra	16th	Relegated
2020	Tier 4	Division 2	Norra Götaland	2nd	
2021	Tier 4	Division 2	Norra Götaland	1st	Promoted
2022	Tier 3	Ettan	Södra	3rd	
2023	Tier 3	Ettan	Södra	1st	Promoted
2024	Tier 2	Superettan		12th	
2025	Tier 2	Superettan		4th	

* League restructuring in 2006 resulted in a new division being created at Tier 3 and subsequent divisions dropping a level.

== Attendances ==
In recent seasons IK Oddevold have had the following average attendances:

Season	Average Attendance	Division / Section	Level
2007	267	Div 2 Västra Götaland	Tier 4
2008	467	Div 2 Västra Götaland	Tier 4
2009	478	Div 1 Södra	Tier 3
2010	691	Div 2 Västra Götaland	Tier 4
2011	618	Div 1 Södra	Tier 3
2012	884	Div 1 Södra	Tier 3
2013	690	Div 1 Södra	Tier 3

* Attendances are provided in the Publikliga sections of the Svenska Fotbollförbundet website.

== Players ==
=== Current squad ===
As of 1 September 2026

Note: Flags indicate national team as defined under FIFA eligibility rules; some limited exceptions apply. Players may hold more than one non-FIFA nationality.

No.	Pos.	Nation	Player
3	DF	SWE	Erik Hedenquist
4	DF	SWE	Philip Engelbrektsson
5	MF	SWE	Esim Mehmed
6	DF	SWE	Jesper Merbom Adolfsson
7	MF	SWE	Vincent Sundberg
8	MF	SWE	Oscar Iglicar Berntsson
9	FW	FIN	Rudi Vikström
10	FW	LBN	Leonardo Farah Shahin
11	MF	MKD	Daniel Krezic
12	GK	NOR	Morten Sætra
13	FW	LBR	Emmanuel Gono (on loan from AIK)
14	MF	SWE	Gabriel Sandberg
15	MF	SWE	Elias Forsberg
16	MF	CIV	Awaka Djoro (on loan from Kalmar FF)

No.	Pos.	Nation	Player
17	MF	SWE	Olle Kjellman Olblad
18	FW	SWE	Gustav Forssell
19	MF	SWE	Hugo Engström
20	MF	SWE	Adam Engelbrektsson
21	DF	SWE	Oliver Thoreson
22	DF	SWE	Oskar Cotton (on loan from Brommapojkarna)
23	FW	KOS	Aulon Bitiqi (on loan from Varbergs BoIS)
24	DF	SWE	Mattias Bahno
25	DF	SWE	Jimi Dos Reis Nikko
26	MF	SWE	Freddie Lantz (on loan from Göteborg U19)
27	MF	NGR	Timi Destiny
29	GK	SWE	Noel Hermansson
33	GK	SWE	Filip Järlesand

=== Out on loan ===
Note: Flags indicate national team as defined under FIFA eligibility rules; some limited exceptions apply. Players may hold more than one non-FIFA nationality.

No.	Pos.	Nation	Player
23	MF	SWE	Riane Haidar (at Vänersborgs IF until 30 November 2026)

== Management ==
=== Organisation ===
As of 20 May 2012.

Position	Name
Chairman	(Sweden) Stefan Mattsson
Secretary	(Sweden) Leif Lindvärn

=== Technical staff ===
As of 20 June 2018.

Position	Name
Director of sports	(Sweden) Bjarne Svensson
Manager, Head Coach First Team	(Sweden) Janne Carlsson
Assistant coach First Team	(Sweden) Hans Prytz
Goalkeeping coach	(Sweden) Mattias Gustavvson
Equipment Manager/Team Manager	(Sweden) Ronny Albinsson

== Achievements ==
=== League ===
- Division 1 Södra:
  - Winners (2): 1995, 2023
  - Runner-up (1): 2013
- Division 2 Västra Götaland:
  - Winners (2): 2008, 2010
- Division 3 Nordvästra Götaland:
  - Winners (1): 2003
  - Runner-up (2): 2000, 2001

== Club records ==
- Biggest league victory: 14–0 vs. Groheds IF in Division 6, 20 May 1951
- Biggest league defeat: 0–6 vs. IFK Malmö in Division 2, 3 June 1963
- Highest league placement: 14th in Allsvenskan, 1996
- Highest attendance: 10,605 vs. IFK Göteborg, 2 May 1996
- Most league appearances: 252, (Sweden) Jan Kristiansson 1975–1987
- Most league goals:143, (Sweden) Tommy Reinhardt 1967–1970, 1976–1982
