= 2012 AIK Fotboll season =

AIK
2012 season
- Chairman: Johan Segui
- Manager: Andreas Alm
- Stadium: Råsunda Stadium
- Allsvenskan: 4th
- Svenska Cupen: Progress to 2013 season
- Supercupen: Runners-up
- UEFA Europa League: Group stage
- Top goalscorer: League: Celso Borges (8); All: Celso Borges (9)
- Highest home attendance: 28,552 vs Napoli (22 November 2012)
- Lowest home attendance: 5,840 vs FH (19 July 2012)
- Average home league attendance: 14,311 (Allsvenskan - 4 November 2012); 14,241 (All competitions - 22 November 2012)
| Home colours | Away colours |

The 2012 AIK Fotboll season was spent in the Allsvenskan.

== Squad ==
As of match played 6 December 2012

| No. | Name | Nationality | Position | Date of birth (age) | Signed from | Signed in | Contract ends | Apps. | Goals |
Goalkeepers
| 13 | Kyriakos Stamatopoulos | (Canada) | GK | 28 August 1979 (aged 33) | Tromsø | 2011 | | 18 | 0 |
| 27 | Ivan Turina | (Croatia) | GK | 3 October 1980 (aged 32) | Dinamo Zagreb | 2010 | | 81 | 0 |
| 76 | Lee Baxter | (Sweden) | GK | 17 June 1976 (aged 36) | Landskrona BoIS | 2008 | | | |
Defenders
| 2 | Niklas Backman | (Sweden) | DF | 13 November 1988 (aged 24) | Väsby United | 2010 | | 102 | 2 |
| 3 | Per Karlsson | (Sweden) | DF | 2 January 1986 (aged 26) | Academy | 2003 | | | |
| 4 | Nils-Eric Johansson | (Sweden) | DF | 13 January 1980 (aged 32) | Leicester City | 2007 | | 192 | 8 |
| 6 | Alexander Milošević | (Sweden) | DF | 30 January 1992 (aged 20) | Vasalund | 2011 | 2014 | 36 | 1 |
| 16 | Martin Lorentzson | (Sweden) | DF | 21 July 1984 (aged 28) | Assyriska | 2010 | | 91 | 9 |
| 45 | Daniel Majstorović | (Sweden) | DF | 5 April 1977 (aged 35) | Celtic | 2012 | | 7 | 0 |
Midfielders
| 5 | Robert Persson | (Sweden) | MF | 13 November 1979 (aged 33) | Malmö | 2010 | | | |
| 7 | Helgi Daníelsson | (Iceland) | MF | 13 July 1981 (aged 31) | Hansa Rostock | 2010 | | 81 | 4 |
| 8 | Daniel Tjernström | (Sweden) | MF | 19 February 1974 (aged 38) | Örebro SK | 1999 | | | |
| 10 | Celso Borges | (Costa Rica) | MF | 27 May 1988 (aged 24) | Fredrikstad | 2012 | | 41 | 9 |
| 11 | Lalawélé Atakora | (Togo) | MF | 9 November 1990 (aged 22) | Fredrikstad | 2011 | 2014 | 39 | 2 |
| 15 | Robin Quaison | (Sweden) | MF | 9 October 1993 (aged 19) | Academy | 2011 | | 27 | 2 |
| 20 | Ibrahim Moro | (Ghana) | MF | 10 November 1993 (aged 19) | New Edubiase United | 2012 | | 11 | 0 |
| 24 | Daniel Gustavsson | (Sweden) | MF | 29 August 1990 (aged 22) | Västerås SK | 2009 | | 40 | 3 |
| 28 | Viktor Lundberg | (Sweden) | MF | 4 March 1991 (aged 21) | Väsby United | 2009 | | 100 | 16 |
| 29 | Gabriel Özkan | (Sweden) | MF | 23 May 1986 (aged 26) | IF Brommapojkarna | 2006 | 2013 | 70 | 10 |
Forwards
| 9 | Martin Kayongo-Mutumba | (Sweden) | FW | 15 June 1985 (aged 27) | Väsby United | 2011 | 2013 | 110 | 9 |
| 22 | Kwame Karikari | (Ghana) | FW | 20 January 1992 (aged 20) | International Allies | 2011 | 2014 | 41 | 9 |
| 35 | Henok Goitom | (Sweden) | FW | 22 September 1984 (aged 28) | Almería | 2012 | | 12 | 2 |
| 75 | Mohamed Bangura | (Sierra Leone) | FW | 27 July 1989 (aged 23) | on loan from Celtic | 2012 | 2012 | 54 | 19 |
Out on loan
| 12 | Christian Kouakou | (Sweden) | FW | 20 April 1995 (aged 17) | Academy | 2011 | | 3 | 0 |
| 17 | Sal Jobarteh | (Sweden) | DF | 9 March 1993 (aged 19) | Academy | 2011 | | 0 | 0 |
| 18 | Nicklas Maripuu | (Sweden) | MF | 2 March 1992 (aged 20) | Väsby United | 2010 | | 14 | 0 |
| 19 | Alhassan Kamara | (Sierra Leone) | FW | 16 March 1993 (aged 19) | Kallon | 2012 | | 12 | 0 |
| 23 | Edward Owusu | (Sweden) | DF | 13 January 1994 (aged 18) | Brommapojkarna | 2011 | | 0 | 0 |
Left during the season
| 26 | Pontus Engblom | (Sweden) | FW | 3 November 1991 (aged 21) | IFK Sundsvall | 2009 | | 34 | 3 |

== Transfers ==
=== In ===
| Date | Position | Nationality | Name | From | Fee | Ref. |
|---|---|---|---|---|---|---|
| 1 January 2012 | DF | (Sweden) | David Fällman | Väsby United | Undisclosed | |
| 1 January 2012 | DF | (Sweden) | Edward Owusu | IF Brommapojkarna | Undisclosed | |
| 1 January 2012 | FW | (Costa Rica) | Celso Borges | Fredrikstad | Undisclosed | |
| 19 March 2012 | MF | (Sweden) | Robin Palacios | Väsby United | Undisclosed | |
| 1 August 2011 | DF | (Sweden) | Daniel Majstorović | Celtic | Free | |
| 16 August 2011 | FW | (Sweden) | Henok Goitom | Almeria | Undisclosed | |

=== Loans in ===
| Start date | Position | Nationality | Name | From | End date | Ref. |
|---|---|---|---|---|---|---|
| 28 August 2012 | FW | (Sierra Leone) | Mohamed Bangura | Celtic | 31 December 2012 | |
| 3 September 2012 | FW | (Sierra Leone) | Tom Bongay | Old Edwardians | 31 December 2012 | |

=== Out ===
| Date | Position | Nationality | Name | To | Fee | Ref. |
|---|---|---|---|---|---|---|
| 3 January 2012 | FW | (Brazil) | Antônio Flávio | Nanchang Hengyuan | Undisclosed | |
| 9 July 2012 | FW | (Sweden) | Pontus Engblom | Haugesund | Undisclosed | |

=== Loans out ===
| Start date | Position | Nationality | Name | To | End date | Ref. |
|---|---|---|---|---|---|---|
| 1 January 2012 | DF | (Sweden) | Jacob Ericsson | Karlstad | 31 December 2012 | |
| 19 March 2012 | MF | (Sweden) | Robin Palacios | Akropolis IF | 16 August 2012 | |
| 30 March 2012 | FW | (Ghana) | Kwame Karikari | Degerfors IF | 16 August 2012 | |
| 11 July 2012 | DF | (Sweden) | Sal Jobarteh | IK Sirius | 31 December 2012 | |
| 11 July 2012 | MF | (Sweden) | Nicklas Maripuu | Umeå FC | 31 December 2012 | |
| 16 August 2012 | MF | (Sweden) | Robin Palacios | IK Frej | 31 December 2012 | |
| 17 August 2012 | FW | (Sierra Leone) | Alhassan Kamara | Örebro | 31 December 2012 | |
| 31 August 2012 | FW | (Sweden) | Edward Owusu | Akropolis IF | 31 December 2012 | |
| 31 August 2012 | FW | (Sweden) | Christian Kouakou | Akropolis IF | 31 December 2012 | |

=== Released ===
| Date | Position | Nationality | Name | Joined | Date | Ref |
|---|---|---|---|---|---|---|
| 16 February 2012 | FW | (Bosnia and Herzegovina) | Admir Ćatović | Assyriska | 6 May 2012 | |
| 7 March 2012 | DF | (Sweden) | David Fällman | Gefle IF | 21 March 2012 | |

== Friendlies ==
| 29 January 2012 | RNK Split | 1–0 | AIK | Alanya, Turkey |
| 16:00 CET (UTC+1) | 31' | Report | Backman (yellow card) 54'; Kamara (yellow card) 78' | Stadium: Topkapi Sports Complex; Attendance: 100 |

| 4 February 2012 | AIK | 0–1 | IFK Norrköping | Stockholm |
| 13:00 CET (UTC+1) | Kamara (yellow card) 22'; Fällman (yellow card) 40' | Report | Telo 36'; Hasani (yellow card) 40'; Þorvaldsson (yellow card) 55'; Ajdarević (yellow card) 86' | Stadium: Skytteholms IP; Attendance: 2,312; Referee: Jonas Eriksson |

| 11 February 2012 | AIK | 3–1 | Gefle IF | Stockholm |
| 13:00 CET (UTC+1) | Karikari (yellow card) 42' (yellow-red card) 45'; Lorentzson 61'; Gustavsson 68'; Atakora 86' | Report | Dahlberg (yellow card) 26' (goal) 37'; Lantto (yellow card) 82' | Stadium: Skytteholms IP; Attendance: 1,820; Referee: Ozan Camlibel |

| 18 February 2012 | AIK | 0–2 | Kalmar | Stockholm |
| 13:00 CET (UTC+1) | Kamara (red card) 41' | Report | McDonald 36', 53'; Fagercrantz (yellow card) 62' | Stadium: Skytteholms IP; Attendance: 2,165; Referee: Stefan Johannesson |

| 21 February 2012 | AIK | 1–0 | Eskilstuna City | Stockholm |
| 11:30 CET (UTC+1) | Johansson (yellow card) 47'; Skogh 82' | Report | | Stadium: Skytteholms IP; Attendance: 400; Referee: Dragan Banjac |

| 27 February 2012 Portland Timbers Tournament | Chivas USA | 0–2 | AIK | Portland |
| 17:00 CET (UTC+1) | | Report | Lorentzson (yellow card) 18'; Kamara (yellow card) 31' (goal) 52'; Lundberg 41' | Stadium: Jeld-Wen Field; Referee: Paul Ward |

| 1 March 2012 Portland Timbers Tournament | San Jose Earthquakes | 0–0 | AIK | Portland |
| 17:00 CET (UTC+1) | Zayner (red card) 60' | Report | Backman (yellow card) 44'; Jobarteh (yellow card) 80' | Stadium: Jeld-Wen Field; Referee: Juan Guzmán |

| 4 March 2012 Portland Timbers Tournament | Portland Timbers | 1–0 | AIK | Portland |
| 17:00 CET (UTC+1) | Boyd 7'; Jewsbury (yellow card) 22'; Chabala (yellow card) 90' | Report | Johansson (yellow card) 66'; Lorentzson (yellow card) 86' | Stadium: Jeld-Wen Field; Attendance: 17,357; Referee: David Gantar |

| 17 March 2012 | AIK | 3–2 | Assyriska | Stockholm |
| 13:00 CET (UTC+1) | Lundberg 34'; Karikari 52', 64'; Persson (yellow card) 57'; Milošević (yellow card) 75' | Report | Besara 8', 78' | Stadium: Skytteholms IP; Attendance: 1,632; Referee: Martin Strömbergsson |

| 13 June 2012 | Örebro | 1–0 | AIK | Örebro |
| 18:00 CET (UTC+1) | Holmberg 33'; Haginge (yellow card) 54'; Grahn (yellow card) 75' | Report | Daníelsson (yellow card) 75' | Stadium: Behrn Arena; Attendance: 547; Referee: Mohammed Al-Hakim |

| 20 June 2012 | GIF Sundsvall | 1–2 | AIK | Norrtälje |
| 18:30 CET (UTC+1) | Pires 73'; Haginge (yellow card) 54'; Grahn (yellow card) 75'; Nilsson (yellow card) 82' | Report | Lundberg 9' (yellow card) 67'; Borges (yellow card) 23'; Lorentzson (yellow card) 31' (goal) 32'; Backman (yellow card) 66'; Kamara (yellow card) 90+3' | Stadium: Norrtälje IP; Attendance: 648; Referee: Johan Hamlin |

| 15 November 2012 | AIK | 2–0 | AIK | Stockholm |
| 13:30 CET (UTC+1) | Goitom 25', 72' | Report | Barrow (yellow card) 51' | Stadium: Friends Arena; Attendance: 20; Referee: Björn Särnbrink |

== Competitions ==
=== Overview ===
| Competition | First match | Last match | Starting round | Final position | Record | | | | | | | |
| Competition | First match | Last match | Starting round | Final position | Pld | W | D | L | GF | GA | GD | Win % |
|---|---|---|---|---|---|---|---|---|---|---|---|---|
| Allsvenskan | 1 April 2012 | 4 November 2012 | Matchday 1 | 4th | 30 | 15 | 10 | 5 | 41 | 27 | +14 | 50.00 |
| Svenska Cupen | 12 September 2012 | Progress to 2013 season | Second round | Progress to 2013 season | 1 | 1 | 0 | 0 | 1 | 0 | +1 | 100.00 |
| Svenska Supercupen | 24 March 2012 | 24 March 2012 | Final | Runners-up | 1 | 0 | 0 | 1 | 0 | 4 | −4 | 0.00 |
| UEFA Europa League | 19 July 2012 | 6 December 2012 | Second qualifying round | Group stage | 12 | 4 | 2 | 6 | 12 | 17 | −5 | 33.33 |
| Total | | | | | 44 | 20 | 12 | 12 | 54 | 48 | +6 | 45.45 |

Last updated: 6 December 2012
Source: Competitions

=== Svenska Supercupen ===
| 24 March 2012 | Helsingborg | 2–0 | AIK | Helsingborg |
| 14:00 CET (UTC+1) | Bouaouzan 58', 70'; Nordmark (yellow card) 60' | Report | Karikari (yellow card) 52'; Turina (yellow card) 59'; Tjernström (yellow card) 61'; Atakora (yellow card) 61'; Milošević (red card) 90+1'; Backman (yellow card) 90+4' | Stadium: Olympia; Attendance: 5,590; Referee: Markus Strömbergsson |

=== Allsvenskan ===
==== League table ====
| Pos | Team | Pld | W | D | L | GF | GA | GD | Pts | Qualification or relegation |
|---|---|---|---|---|---|---|---|---|---|---|
| 2 | BK Häcken | 30 | 17 | 6 | 7 | 67 | 36 | +31 | 57 | Qualification to Europa League second qualifying round |
| 3 | Malmö FF | 30 | 16 | 8 | 6 | 49 | 33 | +16 | 56 | Qualification to Europa League first qualifying round |
| 4 | AIK | 30 | 15 | 10 | 5 | 41 | 27 | +14 | 55 | |
| 5 | IFK Norrköping | 30 | 15 | 7 | 8 | 50 | 43 | +7 | 52 | |
| 6 | Helsingborgs IF | 30 | 13 | 11 | 6 | 52 | 33 | +19 | 50 | |

Source: svenskfotboll.se (in Swedish)
Rules for classification: 1) points; 2) goal difference; 3) number of goals scored.

==== Results summary ====
| Overall | | | | | | | | Home | | | | | | Away | | | | | |
| Pld | W | D | L | GF | GA | GD | Pts | W | D | L | GF | GA | GD | W | D | L | GF | GA | GD |
|---|---|---|---|---|---|---|---|---|---|---|---|---|---|---|---|---|---|---|---|
| 30 | 15 | 10 | 5 | 41 | 27 | +14 | 55 | 7 | 6 | 2 | 23 | 12 | +11 | 8 | 4 | 3 | 18 | 15 | +3 |

Last updated: 16 May 2013.
Source: (in Swedish)

==== Results ====
| 1 April 2012 1 | AIK | 0–0 | Mjällby | Stockholm |
| 14:00 CEST (UTC+2) | Lorentzson (yellow card) 28'; Johansson (yellow card) 45+1' | Report | Ivanovski (yellow card) 62' | Stadium: Råsunda Stadion; Attendance: 20,557; Referee: Michael Lerjeus |

| 9 April 2012 2 | Kalmar FF | 1–2 | AIK | Kalmar |
| 17:30 CEST (UTC+2) | Söderqvist 84' | Report | Kayongo-Mutumba 21'; Backman (yellow card) 61'; Atakora (yellow card) 71'; Borges 90' | Stadium: Guldfågeln Arena; Attendance: 10,079; Referee: Markus Strömbergsson |

| 12 April 2012 3 | AIK | 1–1 | IFK Göteborg | Stockholm |
| 17:30 CEST (UTC+2) | Johansson (yellow card) 14'; Engblom 68' | Report | Haglund (yellow card) 34'; Jónsson 90+2' | Stadium: Råsunda Stadion; Attendance: 15,702; Referee: Jonas Eriksson |

| 15 April 2012 4 | Syrianska | 0–1 | AIK | Södertälje |
| 15:00 CEST (UTC+2) | Jawo (yellow card) 5'; Skenderović (yellow card) 41'; Bååth (yellow card) 90+1' | Report | Milošević (yellow card) 50'; Atakora 61'; Daníelsson (yellow card) 73' | Stadium: Södertälje Fotbollsarena; Attendance: 3,093; Referee: Michael Lerjeus |

| 22 April 2012 5 | AIK | 1–1 | GIF Sundsvall | Stockholm |
| 17:30 CEST (UTC+2) | Milošević 14'; Borges (yellow card) 83' | Report | Walker (yellow card) 33', (goal) 60'; Lundström (yellow card) 68'; Holster (yellow card) 69'; Forsberg (yellow card) 90' | Stadium: Råsunda Stadion; Attendance: 9,771; Referee: Stefan Johannesson |

| 26 April 2012 6 | Gefle | 0–1 | AIK | Gävle |
| 18:30 CEST (UTC+2) | Mård (yellow card) 90+1' | Report | Borges 1'; Persson (yellow card) 29' | Stadium: Strömvallen; Attendance: 4,181; Referee: Jonas Eriksson |

| 2 May 2012 7 | Helsingborg | 0–0 | AIK | Helsingborg |
| 19:00 CEST (UTC+2) | | Report | Persson (yellow card) 50'; Quaison (yellow card) 78' | Stadium: Olympia; Attendance: 9,343; Referee: Andreas Jonsson |

| 8 May 2012 8 | AIK | 1–1 | Djurgården | Stockholm |
| 19:00 CEST (UTC+2) | Persson (yellow card) 72'; Pedersen 89' (o.g.) | Report | Pedersen (yellow card) 45+1'; Gustafsson 58'; Sjölund (yellow card) 67'; Vaiho (yellow card) 69' | Stadium: Råsunda Stadion; Attendance: 27,112; Referee: Stefan Johannesson |

| 13 May 2012 9 | Elfsborg | 1–0 | AIK | Borås |
| 17:30 CEST (UTC+2) | Augustsson (yellow card) 20'; Elm 73' | Report | Atakora (yellow card) 37' | Stadium: Borås Arena; Attendance: 9,817; Referee: Martin Strömbergson |

| 16 May 2012 10 | Örebro | 2–2 | AIK | Örebro |
| 19:15 CEST (UTC+2) | Saeid 33'; Samuelsson (yellow card) 57'; Atashkadeh 90+1' (pen.); Wikström (yellow card) 90+3' | Report | Borges 21'; Lundberg 57', (yellow card) 88'; Persson (red card) 90+1' | Stadium: Behrn Arena; Attendance: 7,722; Referee: Markus Strömbergsson |

| 20 May 2012 11 | AIK | 5–2 | IFK Norrköping | Stockholm |
| 17:30 CEST (UTC+2) | Gustavsson 18', 77'; Lundberg 21'; Lorentzson 33'; Quaison 53' | Report | Þorvaldsson 4'; Ajdarević 17'; Frempong (yellow card) 22'; Hassan (yellow card) 33'; Smedberg Dalence (yellow card) 66' | Stadium: Råsunda Stadion; Attendance: 11,896; Referee: Michael Lerjeus |

| 24 May 2012 12 | AIK | 1–0 | GAIS | Stockholm |
| 19:00 CEST (UTC+2) | Lundberg (yellow card) 15' (goal) 90+1' | Report | Johansson (yellow card) 32'; Angus (yellow card) 72'; Olsson (yellow card) 86' | Stadium: Råsunda Stadion; Attendance: 11,112; Referee: Andreas Ekberg |

| 2 July 2012 13 | Malmö | 4–0 | AIK | Malmö |
| 19:00 CEST (UTC+2) | Figueiredo 15', 42'; Durmaz 29', 39' | Report | | Stadium: Swedbank Stadion; Attendance: 14,583; Referee: Martin Hansson |

| 8 July 2012 14 | AIK | 3–1 | BK Häcken | Stockholm |
| 16:00 CEST (UTC+2) | Borges 3', 57'; Quaison 5'; Lundberg (yellow card) 41'; Atakora (yellow card) 76'; Kamara (yellow card) 90+3' | Report | Majeed 6'; Drugge (yellow card) 85'; Chatto (yellow card) 90+2' | Stadium: Råsunda Stadion; Attendance: 9,383; Referee: Daniel Stålhammar |

| 14 July 2012 15 | Åtvidaberg | 2–0 | AIK | Åtvidaberg |
| 16:00 CEST (UTC+2) | Hallingström (yellow card) 28'; Eriksson 75'; Prodell 81' | Report | Backman (yellow card) 77' | Stadium: Kopparvallen; Attendance: 7,621; Referee: Martin Strömbergsson |

| 22 July 2012 16 | AIK | 1–0 | Åtvidaberg | Stockholm |
| 18:30 CEST (UTC+2) | Lorentzson 43'; Borges (yellow card) 89' | Report | Pettersson (yellow card) 32' | Stadium: Råsunda Stadion; Attendance: 9,231; Referee: Andreas Ekberg |

| 29 July 2012 17 | Mjällby | 0–1 | AIK | Hällevik |
| 16:00 CEST (UTC+2) | Nicklasson (yellow card) 14'; Ivanovski (yellow card) 84'; Leandersson (yellow card) 90'; Arokoyo (yellow card) 90+3' | Report | Daníelsson (yellow card) 59'; Persson 85' (pen.); Lorentzson (yellow card) 88' | Stadium: Strandvallen; Attendance: 4,539; Referee: Markus Strömbergsson |

| 5 August 2012 18 | AIK | 1–2 | Kalmar FF | Stockholm |
| 18:30 CEST (UTC+2) | Karikari 80'; Kamara (yellow card) 90+3' | Report | Arajuuri 29'; Dauda 47'; Andersson (yellow card) 75'; Berisha (yellow card) 90+1' | Stadium: Råsunda Stadion; Attendance: 9,905; Referee: Michael Lerjeus |

| 12 August 2012 19 | AIK | 3–0 | Örebro | Stockholm |
| 15:00 CEST (UTC+2) | Karikari 42'; Kayongo-Mutumba 49'; Gustavsson 90+2' | Report | Bamberg (yellow card) 90+1'; Wikström (yellow card) 90+3' | Stadium: Råsunda Stadion; Attendance: 8,352; Referee: Martin Hansson |

| 26 August 2012 20 | GAIS | 0–1 | AIK | Gothenburg |
| 15:00 CEST (UTC+2) | Ayarna (yellow card) 55' | Report | Karlsson (yellow card) 16'; Karikari 82'; Atakora (yellow card) 90+1' | Stadium: Gamla Ullevi; Attendance: 3,865; Referee: Martin Hansson |

| 2 September 2012 21 | AIK | 2–1 | Helsingborg | Stockholm |
| 15:00 CEST (UTC+2) | Quaison (yellow card) 24'; Turina (yellow card) 30'; Lorentzson 75'; Borges 90+2'; Backman (yellow card) 90+3' | Report | Accam 9'; Đurđić (yellow card) 20'; Bedoya (yellow card) 23'; Hansson (yellow card) 76'; Larsson (yellow card) 82' | Stadium: Råsunda Stadion; Attendance: 14,548; Referee: Markus Strömbergsson |

| 16 September 2012 22 | Djurgården | 0–3 | AIK | Stockholm |
| 14:30 CEST (UTC+2) | Fejzullahu (yellow card) 57' | Report | Karikari 49'; Bangura 71'; Borges 86'; Lundberg (yellow card) 90+1' | Stadium: Råsunda Stadion; Attendance: 30,857; Referee: Jonas Eriksson |

| 23 September 2012 23 | IFK Norrköping | 2–2 | AIK | Norrköping |
| 17:30 CEST (UTC+2) | Frempong (yellow card) 29'; Þorvaldsson 71', 87', (yellow card) 72' | Report | Borges 20'; Karikari 84' (yellow card) 86' | Stadium: Idrottsparken; Attendance: 9,713; Referee: Michael Lerjeus |

| 26 September 2012 24 | AIK | 1–1 | Elfsborg | Stockholm |
| 20:00 CEST (UTC+2) | Majstorović (yellow card) 25'; Moro (yellow card) 44'; Lorentzson 56', (yellow card) 63'; Karikari (yellow card) 61' | Report | Claesson 24', (yellow card) 31'; Klarström (yellow card) 31'; Svensson (yellow card) 45+1'; Hiljemark (yellow card) 45+1' | Stadium: Råsunda Stadion; Attendance: 14,609; Referee: Martin Hansson |

| 30 September 2012 25 | GIF Sundsvall | 2–3 | AIK | Sundsvall |
| 15:00 CEST (UTC+2) | Skúlason 31'; Forsberg 48' | Report | Bangura 17', 71', (yellow card) 88'; Lundberg 74' | Stadium: Norrporten Arena; Attendance: 4,019; Referee: Michael Lerjeus |

| 7 October 2012 26 | AIK | 0–1 | Gefle | Stockholm |
| 15:00 CEST (UTC+2) | | Report | Bernhardsson (yellow card) 50'; Mård (yellow card) 52'; Fällman (yellow card) 85'; Orlov 90+2' | Stadium: Råsunda Stadion; Attendance: 10,776; Referee: Andreas Ekberg |

| 21 October 2012 27 | IFK Göteborg | 0–1 | AIK | Gothenburg |
| 17:30 CEST (UTC+2) | | Report | Backman 15', (yellow card) 53' | Stadium: Gamla Ullevi; Attendance: 10,727; Referee: Martin Hansson |

| 28 October 2012 28 | AIK | 1–1 | Syrianska | Stockholm |
| 13:00 CEST (UTC+2) | Karlsson (yellow card) 53'; Goitom 60'; Backman (yellow card) 75' | Report | Skenderović (yellow card) 38'; Touma 42'; Jawo (red card) 86' | Stadium: Råsunda Stadion; Attendance: 13,653; Referee: Martin Hansson |

| 1 November 2012 29 | BK Häcken | 1–1 | AIK | Gothenburg |
| 20:00 CET (UTC+1) | Lewicki 14', (yellow card) 75'; Wahlström (yellow card) 19'; Anklev (yellow card) 54' | Report | Daníelsson 45', (yellow card) 83'; Karlsson (yellow card) 58' | Stadium: Rambergsvallen; Attendance: 5,753; Referee: Stefan Johannesson |

| 4 November 2012 30 | AIK | 2–0 | Malmö | Stockholm |
| 15:00 CET (UTC+1) | Bangura 33'; Borges (yellow card) 37'; Lundberg 62'; Majstorović (yellow card) 81' | Report | | Stadium: Råsunda Stadion; Attendance: 28,057; Referee: Jonas Eriksson |

=== Svenska Cupen ===
| 12 September 2012 Second Round | Torslanda | 0–1 | AIK | Torslanda |
| 17:30 CEST (UTC+2) | Erlandsson (yellow card) 26'; Söderström (yellow card) 66' | Report | Lundberg 38' (yellow card) 87'; Moro (yellow card) 72' | Stadium: Torslandavallen; Attendance: 1,023; Referee: Magnus Lindgren |

The Group Stage took place during the 2013 season.

=== UEFA Europa League ===
==== Qualifying round ====
| 19 July 2012 Second qualifying round 1st leg | AIK (Sweden) | 1–1 | (Iceland) FH | Stockholm, Sweden |
| 19:00 CEST (UTC+2) | Lundberg 56' | Report | Guðnason 40'; Thomas (yellow card) 78'; Rúnarsson (yellow card) 90+2' | Stadium: Råsunda Stadium; Attendance: 5,840; Referee: Wim Smet (Belgium) |

| 26 July 2012 Second qualifying round 2nd leg | FH (Iceland) | 0–1 (1–2 agg.) | (Sweden) AIK | Hafnarfjörður, Iceland |
| 21:15 CEST (UTC+2) | Pálsson (yellow card) 48'; Þórisson (yellow card) 61' | | Lorentzson 40'; Persson (yellow card) 59'; Johansson (yellow card) 67'; Kayongo-Mutumba (yellow card) 85'; Daníelsson (yellow card) 86' | Stadium: Kaplakriki; Attendance: 2,198; Referee: Simon Lee Evans (Wales) |

| 2 August 2012 Third qualifying round 1st leg | AIK (Sweden) | 3–0 | (Poland) Lech Poznań | Stockholm, Sweden |
| 19:00 CEST (UTC+2) | Lorentzson 60'; Persson (yellow card) 62'; Borges 78'; Lundberg 86'; Daníelsson (yellow card) 90+5' | Report | Możdżeń (yellow card) 51'; Henríquez (yellow card) 74'; Lovrencsics (yellow card) 87' | Stadium: Råsunda Stadium; Attendance: 10,658; Referee: Marco Fritz (Germany) |

| 9 August 2012 Third qualifying round 2nd leg | Lech Poznań (Poland) | 1–0 (1–3 agg.) | (Sweden) AIK | Poznań, Poland |
| 20:00 CEST (UTC+2) | Możdżeń 72'; Ubiparip (yellow card) 90+3' | Report | Persson (yellow card) 40'; Turina (yellow card) 81'; Karikari (yellow card) 86' | Stadium: Stadion Miejski; Attendance: 14,750; Referee: Libor Kovařik (Czech Republic) |

| 23 August 2012 Playoff round 1st leg | AIK (Sweden) | 0–1 | (Russia) CSKA Moscow | Stockholm, Sweden |
| 19:00 CEST (UTC+2) | Lorentzson (yellow card) 74' | Report | Honda 62' | Stadium: Råsunda Stadium; Attendance: 16,889; Referee: Kevin Blom (Netherlands) |

| 30 August 2012 Playoff round 2nd leg | CSKA Moscow (Russia) | 0–2 (1–2 agg.) | (Sweden) AIK | Khimki, Russia |
| 19:00 CEST (UTC+2) | | Report | Karikari 6', (yellow card) 39'; Kayongo-Mutumba (yellow card) 27'; Lorentzson 90+3'; Backman (yellow card) 90+3' | Stadium: Arena Khimki; Attendance: 11,000; Referee: Ovidiu Hațegan (Romania) |

==== Group stage ====
| Pos | Team | Pld | W | D | L | GF | GA | GD | Pts | Qualification |
|---|---|---|---|---|---|---|---|---|---|---|
| 1 | (Ukraine) Dnipro Dnipropetrovsk | 6 | 5 | 0 | 1 | 16 | 8 | +8 | 15 | Advance to knockout phase |
| 2 | (Italy) Napoli | 6 | 3 | 0 | 3 | 12 | 12 | 0 | 9 | Advance to knockout phase |
| 3 | (Netherlands) PSV Eindhoven | 6 | 2 | 1 | 3 | 8 | 7 | +1 | 7 | |
| 4 | (Sweden) AIK | 6 | 1 | 1 | 4 | 5 | 14 | −9 | 4 | |

Source: Soccerway

| 20 September 2012 1 | Napoli (Italy) | 4–0 | (Sweden) AIK | Naples, Italy |
| 19:00 CEST (UTC+2) | Vargas 6', 46', 69'; Donadel (yellow card) 45'; Hamšík (red card) 74'; Džemaili 90+1' | Report | Johansson (yellow card) 74'; Bangura (yellow card) 89' | Stadium: Stadio San Paolo; Attendance: 16,560; Referee: Clément Turpin (France) |

| 4 October 2012 2 | AIK (Sweden) | 2–3 | (Ukraine) Dnipro Dnipropetrovsk | Stockholm, Sweden |
| 21:00 CEST (UTC+2) | Daníelsson 5', (yellow card) 90+4'; Goitom 45+1'; Lorentzson (yellow card) 78'; Johansson (yellow card) 82' | Report | Kalinić 41'; Mandzyuk 73'; Seleznyov 83', (yellow card) 83'; Kravchenko (yellow card) 90+4' | Stadium: Råsunda Stadium; Attendance: 10,091; Referee: Ivan Kružliak (Slovakia) |

| 25 October 2012 3 | PSV Eindhoven (Netherlands) | 1–1 | (Sweden) AIK | Eindhoven, Netherlands |
| 21:00 CEST (UTC+2) | Strootman (yellow card) 75'; Lens 80' | Report | Karikari 61'; Turina (yellow card) 90+3'; Majstorović (yellow card) 90+5' | Stadium: Philips Stadion; Attendance: 14,400; Referee: Emir Alečković (Bosnia and Herzegovina) |

| 8 November 2012 4 | AIK (Sweden) | 1–0 | (Netherlands) PSV Eindhoven | Stockholm, Sweden |
| 19:00 CET (UTC+1) | Bangura 12'; Quaison (yellow card) 26' | Report | | Stadium: Råsunda Stadium; Attendance: 12,360; Referee: Maksim Layushkin (Russia) |

| 22 November 2012 5 | AIK (Sweden) | 1–2 | (Italy) Napoli | Stockholm, Sweden |
| 21:00 CET (UTC+1) | Daníelsson 35'; Moro (yellow card) 45'; Backman (yellow card) 71' | Report | Džemaili 20'; Cavani (yellow card) 45+1', (goal) 90+4' (pen.); Aronica (red card) 85'; Behrami (yellow card) 90' | Stadium: Råsunda Stadium; Attendance: 28,552; Referee: Ovidiu Hațegan (Romania) |

| 5 December 2012 6 | Dnipro Dnipropetrovsk (Ukraine) | 4–0 | (Sweden) AIK | Dnipropetrovsk, Ukraine |
| 20:00 CET (UTC+1) | Mazuch (yellow card) 15'; Kalinić 20' (pen.); Zozulya 39', 52'; Kravchenko 86' | Report | Lorentzson (yellow card) 19'; Quaison (yellow card) 69'; Borges (yellow card) 88'; Karikari (yellow card) 89' | Stadium: Dnipro Arena; Attendance: 20,383; Referee: Stephan Studer (Switzerland) |

== Squad statistics ==
As of match played 6 December 2012

=== Appearances and goals ===
| No. | Pos | Nat | Player | Total | | Allsvenskan | | Svenska Cupen | | Svenska Supercupen | | UEFA Europa League | |
| No. | Pos | Nat | Player | Apps | Goals | Apps | Goals | Apps | Goals | Apps | Goals | Apps | Goals |
|---|---|---|---|---|---|---|---|---|---|---|---|---|---|
| 2 | DF | (Sweden) SWE | Niklas Backman | 40 | 1 | 28 | 1 | 1 | 0 | 1 | 0 | 10 | 0 |
| 3 | DF | (Sweden) SWE | Per Karlsson | 34 | 0 | 22+1 | 0 | 0 | 0 | 0 | 0 | 11 | 0 |
| 4 | DF | (Sweden) SWE | Nils-Eric Johansson | 44 | 0 | 30 | 0 | 1 | 0 | 1 | 0 | 12 | 0 |
| 5 | MF | (Sweden) SWE | Robert Persson | 23 | 1 | 12+4 | 1 | 1 | 0 | 1 | 0 | 4+1 | 0 |
| 6 | DF | (Sweden) SWE | Alexander Milošević | 7 | 1 | 6 | 1 | 0 | 0 | 1 | 0 | 0 | 0 |
| 7 | MF | (Iceland) ISL | Helgi Daníelsson | 32 | 3 | 16+3 | 1 | 0 | 0 | 1 | 0 | 11+1 | 2 |
| 8 | MF | (Sweden) SWE | Daniel Tjernström | 18 | 0 | 7+5 | 0 | 0 | 0 | 1 | 0 | 1+4 | 0 |
| 9 | FW | (Uganda) UGA | Martin Kayongo-Mutumba | 37 | 2 | 25+2 | 2 | 0 | 0 | 1 | 0 | 6+3 | 0 |
| 10 | MF | (Costa Rica) CRC | Celso Borges | 41 | 9 | 29 | 8 | 0 | 0 | 0 | 0 | 11+1 | 1 |
| 11 | MF | (Togo) TOG | Lalawélé Atakora | 32 | 1 | 10+12 | 1 | 1 | 0 | 1 | 0 | 7+1 | 0 |
| 13 | GK | (Canada) CAN | Kyriakos Stamatopoulos | 6 | 0 | 6 | 0 | 0 | 0 | 0 | 0 | 0 | 0 |
| 15 | MF | (Sweden) SWE | Robin Quaison | 27 | 2 | 13+5 | 2 | 0+1 | 0 | 0+1 | 0 | 6+1 | 0 |
| 16 | DF | (Sweden) SWE | Martin Lorentzson | 42 | 7 | 29 | 4 | 1 | 0 | 0 | 0 | 12 | 3 |
| 20 | MF | (Ghana) GHA | Ibrahim Moro | 11 | 0 | 4+1 | 0 | 1 | 0 | 0 | 0 | 4+1 | 0 |
| 22 | FW | (Ghana) GHA | Kwame Karikari | 22 | 7 | 6+6 | 5 | 1 | 0 | 1 | 0 | 5+3 | 2 |
| 24 | MF | (Sweden) SWE | Daniel Gustavsson | 14 | 3 | 9+3 | 3 | 1 | 0 | 0 | 0 | 1 | 0 |
| 27 | GK | (Croatia) CRO | Ivan Turina | 38 | 0 | 24 | 0 | 1 | 0 | 1 | 0 | 12 | 0 |
| 28 | MF | (Sweden) SWE | Viktor Lundberg | 40 | 8 | 19+8 | 5 | 1 | 1 | 1 | 0 | 7+4 | 2 |
| 29 | MF | (Sweden) SWE | Gabriel Özkan | 9 | 0 | 1+6 | 0 | 0+1 | 0 | 0+1 | 0 | 0 | 0 |
| 36 | FW | (Sweden) SWE | Henok Goitom | 12 | 2 | 3+6 | 1 | 0+1 | 0 | 0 | 0 | 1+1 | 1 |
| 45 | DF | (Sweden) SWE | Daniel Majstorović | 7 | 0 | 4 | 0 | 1 | 0 | 0 | 0 | 2 | 0 |
| 75 | FW | (Sierra Leone) SLE | Mohamed Bangura | 16 | 5 | 10 | 4 | 0 | 0 | 0 | 0 | 4+2 | 1 |
Players away on loan:
| 12 | FW | (Sweden) SWE | Christian Kouakou | 3 | 0 | 0+3 | 0 | 0 | 0 | 0 | 0 | 0 | 0 |
| 18 | MF | (Sweden) SWE | Nicklas Maripuu | 2 | 0 | 0+2 | 0 | 0 | 0 | 0 | 0 | 0 | 0 |
| 19 | FW | (Sierra Leone) SLE | Alhassan Kamara | 12 | 0 | 3+8 | 0 | 0 | 0 | 0 | 0 | 0+1 | 0 |
Players who appeared for AIK but left during the season:
| 21 | FW | (Sweden) SWE | Pontus Engblom | 7 | 1 | 3+3 | 1 | 0 | 0 | 0+1 | 0 | 0 | 0 |

=== Goal scorers ===
| Place | Position | Nation | Number | Name | Allsvenskan | Svenska Cupen | Svenska Supercupen | UEFA Europa League | Total |
|---|---|---|---|---|---|---|---|---|---|
| 1 | MF | (Costa Rica) | 10 | Celso Borges | 8 | 0 | 0 | 1 | 9 |
| 2 | MF | (Sweden) | 28 | Viktor Lundberg | 5 | 1 | 0 | 2 | 8 |
| 3 | FW | (Ghana) | 22 | Kwame Karikari | 5 | 0 | 0 | 2 | 7 |
| 3 | DF | (Sweden) | 16 | Martin Lorentzson | 4 | 0 | 0 | 3 | 7 |
| 5 | FW | (Sierra Leone) | 75 | Mohamed Bangura | 4 | 0 | 0 | 1 | 5 |
| 6 | MF | (Sweden) | 24 | Daniel Gustavsson | 3 | 0 | 0 | 0 | 3 |
| 6 | MF | (Iceland) | 7 | Helgi Daníelsson | 1 | 0 | 0 | 2 | 3 |
| 8 | MF | (Sweden) | 15 | Robin Quaison | 2 | 0 | 0 | 0 | 2 |
| 8 | FW | (Uganda) | 9 | Martin Kayongo-Mutumba | 2 | 0 | 0 | 0 | 2 |
| 8 | FW | (Sweden) | 36 | Henok Goitom | 1 | 0 | 0 | 1 | 2 |
| 11 | FW | (Sweden) | 21 | Pontus Engblom | 1 | 0 | 0 | 0 | 1 |
| 11 | MF | (Togo) | 11 | Lalawélé Atakora | 1 | 0 | 0 | 0 | 1 |
| 11 | DF | (Sweden) | 6 | Alexander Milošević | 1 | 0 | 0 | 0 | 1 |
| 11 | MF | (Sweden) | 5 | Robert Persson | 1 | 0 | 0 | 0 | 1 |
| 11 | DF | (Sweden) | 2 | Niklas Backman | 1 | 0 | 0 | 0 | 1 |
| 11 | | | | Own goal | 1 | 0 | 0 | 0 | 1 |
| TOTALS | | | | | 41 | 1 | 0 | 12 | 54 |

=== Clean sheets ===
| Place | Position | Nation | Number | Name | Allsvenskan | Svenska Cupen | Svenska Supercupen | UEFA Europa League | Total |
|---|---|---|---|---|---|---|---|---|---|
| 1 | GK | (Croatia) | 27 | Ivan Turina | 10 | 1 | 0 | 4 | 15 |
| 2 | GK | (Canada) | 13 | Kyriakos Stamatopoulos | 2 | 0 | 0 | 0 | 2 |
| TOTALS | | | | | 12 | 1 | 0 | 4 | 17 |

=== Disciplinary record ===
| Number | Nation | Position | Name | Allsvenskan | | Svenska Cupen | | Svenska Supercupen | | UEFA Europa League | | Total | |
| Number | Nation | Position | Name | Booked | Sent off (straight red) | Booked | Sent off (straight red) | Booked | Sent off (straight red) | Booked | Sent off (straight red) | Booked | Sent off (straight red) |
|---|---|---|---|---|---|---|---|---|---|---|---|---|---|
| 2 | (Sweden) | DF | Niklas Backman | 5 | 0 | 0 | 0 | 1 | 0 | 2 | 0 | 8 | 0 |
| 3 | (Sweden) | DF | Per Karlsson | 3 | 0 | 0 | 0 | 0 | 0 | 0 | 0 | 3 | 0 |
| 4 | (Sweden) | DF | Nils-Eric Johansson | 2 | 0 | 0 | 0 | 0 | 0 | 3 | 0 | 5 | 0 |
| 5 | (Sweden) | MF | Robert Persson | 3 | 1 | 0 | 0 | 0 | 0 | 3 | 0 | 6 | 1 |
| 6 | (Sweden) | DF | Alexander Milošević | 1 | 0 | 0 | 0 | 0 | 1 | 0 | 0 | 1 | 1 |
| 7 | (Iceland) | MF | Helgi Daníelsson | 3 | 0 | 0 | 0 | 0 | 0 | 3 | 0 | 6 | 0 |
| 8 | (Sweden) | MF | Daniel Tjernström | 0 | 0 | 0 | 0 | 1 | 0 | 0 | 0 | 1 | 0 |
| 9 | (Uganda) | FW | Martin Kayongo-Mutumba | 0 | 0 | 0 | 0 | 0 | 0 | 2 | 0 | 2 | 0 |
| 10 | (Costa Rica) | MF | Celso Borges | 3 | 0 | 0 | 0 | 0 | 0 | 1 | 0 | 4 | 0 |
| 11 | (Togo) | MF | Lalawélé Atakora | 4 | 0 | 0 | 0 | 1 | 0 | 0 | 0 | 5 | 0 |
| 15 | (Sweden) | MF | Robin Quaison | 2 | 0 | 0 | 0 | 0 | 0 | 2 | 0 | 4 | 0 |
| 16 | (Sweden) | DF | Martin Lorentzson | 3 | 0 | 0 | 0 | 0 | 0 | 3 | 0 | 6 | 0 |
| 20 | (Ghana) | MF | Ibrahim Moro | 1 | 0 | 1 | 0 | 0 | 0 | 1 | 0 | 3 | 0 |
| 22 | (Ghana) | FW | Kwame Karikari | 2 | 0 | 0 | 0 | 1 | 0 | 3 | 0 | 6 | 0 |
| 27 | (Croatia) | GK | Ivan Turina | 1 | 0 | 0 | 0 | 1 | 0 | 2 | 0 | 4 | 0 |
| 28 | (Sweden) | MF | Viktor Lundberg | 4 | 0 | 1 | 0 | 0 | 0 | 0 | 0 | 5 | 0 |
| 45 | (Sweden) | DF | Daniel Majstorović | 2 | 0 | 0 | 0 | 0 | 0 | 1 | 0 | 3 | 0 |
| 75 | (Sierra Leone) | FW | Mohamed Bangura | 1 | 0 | 0 | 0 | 0 | 0 | 1 | 0 | 2 | 0 |
Players away on loan:
| 19 | (Sierra Leone) | FW | Alhassan Kamara | 1 | 0 | 0 | 0 | 0 | 0 | 0 | 0 | 1 | 0 |
Players who left AIK during the season:
| Total | | | | 41 | 1 | 2 | 0 | 5 | 1 | 27 | 0 | 75 | 2 |
