= 2013 AIK Fotboll season =

AIK
2013 season
- Chairman: Johan Strömberg
- Manager: Andreas Alm
- Stadium: Skytteholms IP; Friends Arena
- Allsvenskan: 2nd
- 2012–13 Svenska Cupen: Group Stage
- 2013–14 Svenska Cupen: Second Round vs Sandviken
- Top goalscorer: League: Kennedy Igboananike (14); All: Kennedy Igboananike (16)
- Highest home attendance: 43,463 vs Syrianska (7 April 2013)
- Lowest home attendance: 1,870 vs Syrianska (16 March 2013)
- Average home league attendance: 18,900 (Allsvenskan - 3 November 2013); 17,007 (All competitions - 3 November 2013)
Home colours	Away colours

The 2013 season was AIK's 122nd in existence, their 85th season in Allsvenskan and their 8th consecutive season in the league. The team competed in Allsvenskan and Svenska Cupen.

== Season events ==
=== Preseason ===
On 8 November 2012, AIK announced the signing of Nabil Bahoui to a three-and-a-half-year contract from IF Brommapojkarna, starting on 1 January.

On 14 November 2012, AIK announced the signing of Kennedy Igboananike to a three-year contract from Djurgården, starting on 1 January.

=== April ===
On 3 April, AIK loaned Christian Kouakou to Mjällby, whilst Sal Jobarteh joined AFC Eskilstuna.

On 5 April, AIK loaned Emil Skogh to Kongsvinger.

On 9 April, AIK loaned Oskar Cederling, Robin Palacios and Adam Bergkvist to Akropolis IF, whilst Adhavan Rajamohan joined on a permanent deal.

=== May ===
On 2 May, AIK's Croatian goalkeeper Ivan Turina died while sleeping in his apartment. His wife did not realize that he was dead until she woke up. He left one-year-old twins and his pregnant wife. Subsequently, all matches in Allsvenskan and Superettan honoured Turina with one minute of silence, and in most of the matches, the game will be stopped in the 27th minute for one minute's applause.

On 13 May, Turina's first professional club, Dinamo Zagreb, played a charity game against AIK at the Friends Arena, with all the money received during this game being given to Turina's family. The game was played in 2x27 minutes to honor Turina who wore number 27 while he played for AIK.

On 21 May, AIK announced the signing of Christian Frealdsson to a short-term contract.

=== June ===
On 15 June, Daniel Tjernström announced his retirement.

On 18 June, AIK announced that they had sold Viktor Lundberg to Randers.

=== July ===
On 2 July, AIK announced that they had sold Helgi Daníelsson to Belenenses.

On 4 July, Kwame Karikari extended his contract with AIK until the summer of 2015, whilst also moving to Balıkesirspor on a year-long loan deal with an option to make the move permanent. The following day, 5 July, Daniel Gustavsson joined Örebro on loan for the remainder of the season.

On 11 July, Christian Frealdsson left the club after his short-term contract came to an end, with Patrik Carlgren signing from IK Brage on a contract until the end of 2016.

On 24 July, AIK announced the signing of Ebenezer Ofori from New Edubiase United to a three-and-a-half-year contract, whilst Sal Jobarteh returned from his loan deal at AFC Eskilstuna, to join Dalkurd FF on loan for the remainder of the season.

On 29 July, Lalawélé Atakora extended his contract with AIK until the summer of 2015, whilst also moving to Balıkesirspor on a year-long loan deal with an option to make the move permanent.

== Squad ==
As of match played 3 December 2013

No.	Name	Nationality	Position	Date of birth (age)	Signed from	Signed in	Contract ends	Apps.	Goals
Goalkeepers
13	Kyriakos Stamatopoulos	(Canada)	GK	28 August 1979 (aged 34)	Tromsø	2011		45	0
35	Patrik Carlgren	(Sweden)	GK	8 January 1992 (aged 21)	IK Brage	2013	2016	0	0
76	Lee Baxter	(Sweden)	GK	17 June 1976 (aged 37)	Landskrona BoIS	2008			
Defenders
2	Niklas Backman	(Sweden)	DF	13 November 1988 (aged 24)	Väsby United	2010		113	2
3	Per Karlsson	(Sweden)	DF	2 January 1986 (aged 27)	Academy	2003			
4	Nils-Eric Johansson	(Sweden)	DF	13 January 1980 (aged 33)	Leicester City	2007		224	11
6	Alexander Milošević	(Sweden)	DF	30 January 1992 (aged 21)	Vasalund	2011	2014	56	1
16	Martin Lorentzson	(Sweden)	DF	21 July 1984 (aged 29)	Assyriska	2010		121	12
22	Noah Sundberg	(Sweden)	DF	6 June 1996 (aged 17)	Academy	2013		0	0
23	Edward Owusu	(Sweden)	DF	13 January 1994 (aged 19)	Brommapojkarna	2011		0	0
45	Daniel Majstorović	(Sweden)	DF	5 April 1977 (aged 36)	Celtic	2012		17	1
Midfielders
5	Robert Persson	(Sweden)	MF	13 November 1979 (aged 33)	Malmö	2010			
10	Celso Borges	(Costa Rica)	MF	27 May 1988 (aged 25)	Fredrikstad	2012		68	17
11	Nabil Bahoui	(Sweden)	MF	5 February 1991 (aged 22)	Brommapojkarna	2013	2016	33	9
15	Robin Quaison	(Sweden)	MF	9 October 1993 (aged 20)	Academy	2011		53	7
17	Ebenezer Ofori	(Ghana)	MF	1 July 1995 (aged 18)	New Edubiase United	2013	2016	5	0
20	Ibrahim Moro	(Ghana)	MF	10 November 1993 (aged 19)	New Edubiase United	2012		36	0
25	Sam Lundholm	(Sweden)	MF	1 July 1994 (aged 19)	Academy	2012		9	0
29	Anton Salétros	(Sweden)	MF	12 April 1996 (aged 17)	Academy	2013		1	0
Forwards
9	Martin Kayongo-Mutumba	(Sweden)	FW	15 June 1985 (aged 28)	Väsby United	2011	2013	140	11
19	Alhassan Kamara	(Sierra Leone)	FW	16 March 1993 (aged 20)	Kallon	2012		15	0
21	Kennedy Igboananike	(Nigeria)	FW	26 February 1989 (aged 24)	Djurgården	2013	2015	33	16
36	Henok Goitom	(Sweden)	FW	22 September 1984 (aged 29)	Almería	2012		42	11
Out on loan
12	Christian Kouakou	(Sweden)	FW	20 April 1995 (aged 18)	Academy	2011		3	0
14	Lalawélé Atakora	(Togo)	MF	9 November 1990 (aged 22)	Fredrikstad	2011	2015	49	3
22	Kwame Karikari	(Ghana)	FW	20 January 1992 (aged 21)	International Allies	2011	2015	52	9
24	Daniel Gustavsson	(Sweden)	MF	29 August 1990 (aged 23)	Västerås SK	2009		47	3
	Nicklas Maripuu	(Sweden)	MF	2 March 1992 (aged 21)	Väsby United	2010		14	0
Left during the season
7	Helgi Daníelsson	(Iceland)	MF	13 July 1981 (aged 32)	Hansa Rostock	2010		98	4
8	Daniel Tjernström	(Sweden)	MF	19 February 1974 (aged 39)	Örebro SK	1999			
27	Ivan Turina	(Croatia)	GK	3 October 1980 (aged 33)	Dinamo Zagreb	2010		89	0
28	Viktor Lundberg	(Sweden)	MF	4 March 1991 (aged 22)	Väsby United	2009		110	16
35	Christian Frealdsson	(Sweden)	GK	27 March 1980 (aged 33)	Unattached	2013	2013	0	0

== Transfers ==
=== In ===
Date	Position	Nationality	Name	From	Fee	Ref.
1 January 2013	MF	(Sweden)	Nabil Bahoui	IF Brommapojkarna	Free	
1 January 2013	FW	(Nigeria)	Kennedy Igboananike	Djurgården	Free	
21 May 2013	GK	(Sweden)	Christian Frealdsson	Unattached	Free	
11 July 2013	GK	(Sweden)	Patrik Carlgren	IK Brage	Undisclosed	
24 July 2013	MF	(Ghana)	Ebenezer Ofori	New Edubiase United	Undisclosed	

=== Out ===
Date	Position	Nationality	Name	To	Fee	Ref.
9 April 2013	MF	(Sweden)	Adhavan Rajamohan	Akropolis IF	Undisclosed	
18 June 2013	MF	(Sweden)	Viktor Lundberg	Randers	Undisclosed	
2 July 2013	MF	(Iceland)	Helgi Daníelsson	Belenenses	Undisclosed	

=== Loans out ===
Start date	Position	Nationality	Name	To	End date	Ref.
1 January 2013	FW	(Sierra Leone)	Alhassan Kamara	Örebro	30 June 2013	
3 April 2013	DF	(Sweden)	Sal Jobarteh	AFC Eskilstuna	24 July 2013	
3 April 2013	FW	(Sweden)	Christian Kouakou	Mjällby	30 June 2013	
5 April 2013	DF	(Sweden)	Emil Skogh	Kongsvinger	31 December 2013	
9 April 2013	DF	(Sweden)	Oskar Cederling	Akropolis IF	31 December 2013	
9 April 2013	MF	(Sweden)	Robin Palacios	Akropolis IF	31 December 2013	
9 April 2013	FW	(Sweden)	Adam Bergkvist	Akropolis IF	31 December 2013	
4 July 2013	FW	(Ghana)	Kwame Karikari	Balıkesirspor	31 December 2013	
5 July 2013	MF	(Sweden)	Daniel Gustavsson	Örebro	31 December 2013	
24 July 2013	DF	(Sweden)	Sal Jobarteh	Dalkurd FF	31 December 2013	
29 July 2013	MF	(Togo)	Lalawélé Atakora	Balıkesirspor	30 June 2014	

=== Released ===
Date	Position	Nationality	Name	Joined	Date	Ref
15 June 2013	MF	(Sweden)	Daniel Tjernström	Retirement		
11 July 2013	GK	(Sweden)	Christian Frealdsson			
31 December 2013	MF	(Sweden)	Robert Persson	Örebro		
31 December 2013	FW	(Uganda)	Martin Kayongo-Mutumba	Çaykur Rizespor		

== Friendlies ==
8 February 2013	Ventura County Fusion	1–0	AIK	Ventura, United States
15:45 CET (UTC+1)	Chongo 80'	Report		Stadium: Oxnard College; Attendance: 64

17 February 2013 Portland Timbers Tournament	Dallas	0–0	AIK	Portland, United States
14:30 CET (UTC+1)	Bahoui (yellow card) 52'; Johansson (yellow card) 58'	Report		Stadium: Jeld-Wen Field; Referee: Drew Fischer

20 February 2013 Portland Timbers Tournament	San José Earthquakes	0–0	AIK	Portland, United States
17:00 CET (UTC+1)	Tommy (yellow card) 72'	Report	Moro (red card) 39'; Atakora (yellow card) 46'	Stadium: Jeld-Wen Field; Referee: Ricardo Salazar

24 February 2013 Portland Timbers Tournament	Portland Timbers	1–1	AIK	Portland, United States
17:00 CET (UTC+1)	Harrington 75'	Report	Goitom 28'; Johansson (yellow card) 28'; Milosevic (yellow card) 76'	Stadium: Jeld-Wen Field; Attendance: 14,968; Referee: Baldomero Toledo

5 March 2013	AIK	5–0	AFC United	Stockholm
16:30 CET (UTC+1)	Karikari 13', 31', 78'; Persson (yellow card) 41' (goal) 42'; Owusu (yellow card) 44'; Kouakou 48'	Report	Jawo (yellow card) 13'; Baran (yellow card) 54'; Jansson (yellow card) 89'	Stadium: Skytteholms IP; Attendance: 1,100; Referee: Dragan Banjac

24 March 2013	AIK	2–1	HJK Helsinki	Stockholm
13:00 CET (UTC+1)	Bahoui 26'; Johansson (yellow card) 44'; Lundholm 90+1'	Report	Zeneli 21' (yellow card) 89'; Lindström (yellow card) 34'	Stadium: Friends Arena; Attendance: 4,547; Referee: Stefan Johannesson

13 May 2013 Ivan Turina Charity Game	AIK	0–1	Dinamo Zagreb	Stockholm
18:30 CEST (UTC+2)		Report	Rukavina 23'	Stadium: Friends Arena; Attendance: 8,058; Referee: Martin Strömbergsson

16 June 2013	Huddinge IF	0–4	AIK	Huddinge
19:00 CEST (UTC+2)		Report	Bahoui 12'; Karikari 24'; Stamatopoulos (yellow card) 56'; Igboananike 67'; Quaison 69'	Stadium: Källbrinks IP; Attendance: 1,500; Referee: Andreas Glanberg

6 August 2013	AIK	1–1	Manchester United	Stockholm
19:30 CEST (UTC+2)	Quaison 49'	Report	Henríquez 68'	Stadium: Friends Arena; Attendance: 30,012; Referee: Svein Oddvar Moen

15 October 2013	Örebro	2–3	AIK	Örebro
15:00 CEST (UTC+2)	Hasani 57'; Wikström 66'	Report	Quaison 30'; Ofori 36'; Bahoui 60'; Moro (red card) 55'	Stadium: Trängens IP; Attendance: 400; Referee: Johan Eriksson

11 November 2013	AIK	3–3	IK Sirius	Stockholm
17:00 CET (UTC+1)	Bahoui 26' (pen.); Backman (yellow card) 30'; Markkanen 69', 90'; Johansson (yellow card) 87'	Report	Silva 6'; Ogbu 63'; Andersson 86'	Stadium: Skytteholms IP; Attendance: 400; Referee: Dragan Banjac

18 November 2013	AIK	2–2	Assyriska	Stockholm
17:00 CET (UTC+1)	Ofori (yellow card) 35'; Lundholm 44'; Salétros (yellow card) 48'; Kouakou 54'	Report	Makdissi 40'; Pachajyan 64'	Stadium: Skytteholms IP; Attendance: 300; Referee: Ozan Camlibel

24 November 2013	Flora Tallinn	3–4	AIK	Tallinn, Estonia
12:00 CET (UTC+1)	Alliku 4'; Kase 76', 89'	Report	Owusu 13'; Markkanen 34'; Kouakou 45+1'; Bahoui 79'	Stadium: EJL-i jalgpallihallis Attendance: 300; Referee: Kristo Tohver

== Competitions ==
=== Overview ===
Competition	First match	Last match	Starting round	Final position	Record							
Competition	First match	Last match	Starting round	Final position	Pld	W	D	L	GF	GA	GD	Win %
Allsvenskan	1 April 2013	3 November 2013	Matchday 1	Runners-up	30	17	7	6	54	32	+22	56.67
2012–13 Svenska Cupen	3 March 2013	16 March 2013	From to 2012 season	Group stage	3	1	0	2	4	6	−2	33.33
2013–14 Svenska Cupen	22 August 2013	22 August 2013	Second round	Second round	1	0	0	1	2	3	−1	0.00
Total					34	18	7	9	60	41	+19	52.94

Last updated: 3 November 2013
Source: Competitions

=== Allsvenskan ===
==== League table ====
Pos	Team	Pld	W	D	L	GF	GA	GD	Pts	Qualification or relegation
1	Malmö FF (C)	30	19	6	5	56	30	+26	63	Qualification to Champions League second qualifying round
2	AIK	30	17	7	6	54	32	+22	58	Qualification to Europa League second qualifying round
3	IFK Göteborg	30	16	6	8	49	31	+18	54	Qualification to Europa League first qualifying round
4	Kalmar FF	30	14	10	6	35	26	+9	52	
5	Helsingborgs IF	30	14	7	9	61	41	+20	49	

Source: svenskfotboll.se (in Swedish)
Rules for classification: 1) points; 2) goal difference; 3) number of goals scored.
(C) Champions

==== Results summary ====
Overall								Home						Away					
Pld	W	D	L	GF	GA	GD	Pts	W	D	L	GF	GA	GD	W	D	L	GF	GA	GD
30	17	7	6	54	32	+22	58	9	5	1	26	11	+15	8	2	5	28	21	+7

Last updated: 3 November 2013.
Source: svenskfotboll.se (in Swedish)

==== Results by round ====
Round	1	2	3	4	5	6	7	8	9	10	11	12	13	14	15	16	17	18	19	20	21	22	23	24	25	26	27	28	29	30
Ground	A	H	A	H	A	H	H	A	A	H	A	H	A	H	H	A	A	H	A	H	A	H	H	A	A	H	A	H	A	H
Result	D	D	L	L	W	D	W	L	W	D	W	D	W	W	W	W	W	W	L	W	L	W	D	L	D	W	W	W	W	W
Position	6	10	13	14	11	11	9	10	8	10	7	7	5	5	5	3	3	3	3	4	3	3	4	4	4	4	4	2	2	2

Updated to match(es) played on 3 November 2013. Source: see below
A = Away; H = Home; W = Win; D = Draw; L = Loss

==== Results ====
1 April 2013 1	Elfsborg	2–2	AIK	Borås
17:30 CEST (UTC+2)	Ellegaard (yellow card) 54'; Keene 55', 75'	Report	Moro (yellow card) 19'; Johansson (yellow card) 43'; Bahoui 53'; Daníelsson (yellow card) 60'; Goitom 61'	Stadium: Borås Arena; Attendance: 15,861; Referee: Michael Lerjéus

7 April 2013 2	AIK	0–0	Syrianska	Stockholm
15:00 CEST (UTC+2)	Lorentzson (yellow card) 45'	Report	Pereira (yellow card) 14'; Bååth (yellow card) 70'; Demirtaş (yellow card) 86'	Stadium: Friends Arena; Attendance: 43,466; Referee: Stefan Johannesson

14 April 2013 3	Åtvidaberg	1–0	AIK	Åtvidaberg
15:00 CEST (UTC+2)	Zatara 58'; Tinnerholm (yellow card) 63'; Mete (yellow card) 87'	Report	Milosevic (yellow card) 45'; Kayongo-Mutumba (yellow card) 90+3'	Stadium: Kopparvallen; Attendance: 4,941; Referee: Tobias Mattsson

17 April 2013 4	AIK	0–1	Malmö	Stockholm
19:05 CEST (UTC+2)	Moro (yellow card) 56'	Report	Helander (yellow card) 38'; Rexhepi (yellow card) 85'; Hamad 90+2'	Stadium: Friends Arena; Attendance: 19,641; Referee: Markus Strömbergsson

22 April 2013 5	Gefle	1–2	AIK	Gävle
19:00 CEST (UTC+2)	Faltsetas 84' (yellow card) 56'; Hansson (yellow card) 64'; Asp (yellow card) 90+6'	Report	Borges 76'; Majstorović (yellow card) 83'; Igboananike 96'	Stadium: Strömvallen; Attendance: 4,589; Referee: Tobias Mattsson

28 April 2013 6	AIK	3–3	Halmstad	Stockholm
15:00 CEST (UTC+2)	Moro (yellow card) 28'; Majstorović 39'; Goitom 42'; Johansson (yellow card) 57'; Igboananike 74'; Quaison (red card) 90+3'	Report	Boman 36'; Liverstam (yellow card) 45+1'; Baldvinsson 59'; Blomberg 90'	Stadium: Friends Arena; Attendance: 16,711; Referee: Michael Lerjeus

6 May 2013 7	AIK	3–1	IFK Göteborg	Stockholm
19:05 CEST (UTC+2)	Majstorović (yellow card) 23'; Igboananike 31'; Borges 49'; Goitom (yellow card) 60'; Kayongo-Mutumba 80'	Report	Bjärsmyr (yellow card) 16'; Karlsson (yellow card) 17'; Wæhler (yellow card) 21'; Haglund 24' (pen.)	Stadium: Friends Arena; Attendance: 24,211; Referee: Stefan Johannesson

12 May 2013 8	Kalmar FF	2–1	AIK	Kalmar
15:00 CEST (UTC+2)	Söderqvist 19'; Nouri (yellow card) 30'; Ring 55'	Report	Atakora 87'; Johansson (yellow card) 90+2'	Stadium: Guldfågeln Arena; Attendance: 6,976; Referee: Andreas Ekberg

19 May 2013 9	Öster	2–3	AIK	Växjö
15:00 CEST (UTC+2)	Persson (yellow card) 7'; Pavey 10'; Arce 62'	Report	Bahoui 8'; Daníelsson (yellow card) 27'; Lorentzson 33'; Igboananike 57'; Karikari (yellow card) 85'	Stadium: Myresjöhus Arena; Attendance: 4,792; Referee: Bojan Pandžić

22 May 2013 10	AIK	1–1	Djurgården	Stockholm
19:05 CEST (UTC+2)	Igboananike 5'	Report	Broberg (yellow card) 46'; Jawo 54'; Johansson (yellow card) 86'; Chibsah (yellow card) 90+5'	Stadium: Friends Arena; Attendance: 35,311; Referee: Jonas Eriksson

30 May 2013 11	IFK Norrköping	0–1	AIK	Norrköping
19:05 CEST (UTC+2)	Thorvaldsson (yellow card) 38'; Wiklander (yellow card) 39'; Gerson (yellow card) 49'	Report	Karlsson (yellow card) 25'; Bahoui 26'; Majstorović (yellow card) 46'	Stadium: Idrottsparken; Attendance: 8,875; Referee: Tobias Mattsson

24 June 2013 14	AIK	4–0	IF Brommapojkarna	Stockholm
19:00 CEST (UTC+2)	Goitom 31', 52'; Milošević (yellow card) 34'; Quaison 79' (yellow card) 79'; Johansson 82'	Report	Björkström (yellow card) 7'; Segerström (yellow card) 41'	Stadium: Friends Arena; Attendance: 13,983; Referee: Martin Hansson

27 June 2013 13	Helsingborg	1–2	AIK	Helsingborg
19:00 CEST (UTC+2)	Krafth 33'; Larsson (yellow card) 22' (yellow-red card) 53'; Bedoya (yellow card) 82'; Baffo (yellow card) 85'; Lindström (yellow card) 87'	Report	Borges 74'; Goitom (yellow card) 77'; Milošević (yellow card) 78'; Karikari 85'; Stamatopoulos (yellow card) 90+3'	Stadium: Olympia; Attendance: 11,535; Referee: Martin Strömbergsson

1 July 2013 12	AIK	0–0	Mjällby	Stockholm
19:00 CEST (UTC+2)	Moro (yellow card) 78'	Report	Radetinac (yellow card) 90+2'	Stadium: Friends Arena; Attendance: 13,870; Referee: Michael Lerjeus

7 July 2013 15	AIK	2–0	BK Häcken	Stockholm
17:30 CEST (UTC+2)	Goitom 70'; Åhman-Persson 90+2'	Report	El Kabir (yellow card) 27'	Stadium: Friends Arena; Attendance: 11,753; Referee: Johan Hamlin

14 July 2013 16	Syrianska	1–2	AIK	Södertälje
17:30 CEST (UTC+2)	Kunić (yellow card) 11'; Svärd (yellow card) 43'; Felić 88'	Report	Igboananike 14', 49'; Karlsson (yellow card) 22'; Milošević (red card) 71'	Stadium: Södertälje Fotbollsarena; Attendance: 5,292; Referee: Martin Hansson

22 July 2013 17	BK Häcken	2–3	AIK	Gothenburg
19:00 CEST (UTC+2)	El Kabir 38'; Makondele (yellow card) 65'; Strandberg 87'	Report	Igboananike 4', 52'; Daníelsson (yellow card) 45'; Lorentzson 75'	Stadium: Rambergsvallen; Attendance: 4,531; Referee: Michael Lerjeus

3 August 2013 18	AIK	2–1	Elfsborg	Stockholm
16:05 CEST (UTC+2)	Borges 18' (yellow card) 90+3'; Lorentzson 74'	Report	Hedlund 71'; Klarström (yellow card) 73'; Keene (yellow card) 76'	Stadium: Friends Arena; Attendance: 21,882; Referee: Jonas Eriksson

11 August 2013 19	Malmö	1–0	AIK	Malmö
17:30 CEST (UTC+2)	Halsti 45+1' (yellow card) 35'; Jansson (yellow card) 90+1'	Report	Bahoui (yellow card) 37'; Lorentzson (yellow card) 70'	Stadium: Swedbank Stadion; Attendance: 17,518; Referee: Martin Hansson

19 August 2013 20	AIK	3–2	Åtvidaberg	Stockholm
19:00 CEST (UTC+2)	Bahoui 22', 68'; Quaison (yellow card) 29'; Lorentzson (yellow card) 57'; Borges (yellow card) 87'; Goitom 90+2'	Report	da Silva (yellow card) 34'; Zatara 60'; Santos 85'	Stadium: Friends Arena; Attendance: 13,580; Referee: Bojan Pandžić

25 August 2013 21	Halmstad	1–0	AIK	Halmstad
15:03 CEST (UTC+2)	Blomberg (yellow card) 33'; Selaković 41' (pen.); Magyar (yellow card) 43'; Liverstam (yellow card) 51'; Thydell (yellow card) 82' (yellow-red card) 90+1'	Report	Backman (yellow card) 40'	Stadium: Örjans Vall; Attendance: 6,253; Referee: Tobias Mattsson

31 August 2013 22	AIK	3–0	Gefle	Stockholm
16:00 CEST (UTC+2)	Wikström 37' (o.g.); Borges 64'; Johansson 70'	Report	Faltsetas (yellow card) 16'	Stadium: Friends Arena; Attendance: 12,587; Referee: Andreas Ekberg

15 September 2013 23	AIK	0–0	Kalmar FF	Stockholm
15:00 CEST (UTC+2)	Lorentzson (yellow card) 79'	Report	Öhman (yellow card) 27'; Cramer (yellow card) 71'	Stadium: Friends Arena; Attendance: 15,197; Referee: Martin Strömbergsson

23 September 2013 24	IFK Göteborg	3–1	AIK	Gothenburg
19:05 CEST (UTC+2)	Hysén 30'; Söder 60'; Haglund 90' (pen.)	Report	Johansson 84' (yellow card) 30'; Borges (yellow card) 69'; Bahoui (yellow card) 74'; Igboananike (yellow card) 79'	Stadium: Gamla Ullevi; Attendance: 16,206; Referee: Michael Lerjeus

26 September 2013 25	Djurgården	2–2	AIK	Stockholm
19:20 CEST (UTC+2)	Johansson 6' (yellow card) 90+2'; Broberg (yellow card) 19'; Jawo 38'	Report	Bahoui 11'; Goitom 27' (yellow card) 36'; Milošević (yellow card) 55'	Stadium: Tele2 Arena; Attendance: 27,112; Referee: Stefan Johannesson

30 September 2013 26	AIK	2–1	Öster	Stockholm
19:00 CEST (UTC+2)	Igboananike 25'; Lorentzson (yellow card) 29'; Quaison 74'	Report	Gero 44' (yellow card) 71'; Karlsson (yellow card) 29'; Pavey (yellow card) 90+2'	Stadium: Friends Arena; Attendance: 9,388; Referee: Tobias Mattsson

4 October 2013 27	Mjällby	2–3	AIK	Hällevik
19:00 CEST (UTC+2)	Blomqvist 43' (yellow card) 45+1'; Ericsson 45'	Report	Bahoui 20'; Goitom 25'; Johansson (yellow card) 27'; Igboananike 37'; Moro (yellow card) 78'	Stadium: Strandvallen; Attendance: 3,180; Referee: Bojan Pandžić

21 October 2013 28	AIK	1–0	IFK Norrköping	Stockholm
19:10 CEST (UTC+2)	Borges 12'	Report	Meneses (yellow card) 47'	Stadium: Friends Arena; Attendance: 11,850; Referee: Martin Strömbergsson

27 October 2013 29	Brommapojkarna	0–6	AIK	Stockholm
13:30 CET (UTC+1)		Report	Igboananike 27', 45+4'; Borges 36', 52' (pen.); Kayongo-Mutumba 90'; Quaison 90+3'	Stadium: Tele2 Arena; Attendance: 9,826; Referee: Michael Lerjeus

3 November 2013 30	AIK	2–1	Helsingborg	Stockholm
15:00 CET (UTC+1)	Igboananike 10'; Quaison 36'; Moro (yellow card) 40'; Johansson (yellow card) 83'	Report	Larsson (yellow card) 18'; Accam (yellow card) 44'; Smárason (yellow card) 87'; Khalili 90+3' (pen.)	Stadium: Friends Arena; Attendance: 20,068; Referee: Jonas Eriksson

=== Svenska Cupen ===
==== 2012–13 ====
===== Group stage =====
Pos	Team	Pld	W	D	L	GF	GA	GD	Pts	Qualification	ÖIS	HBK	AIK	SFC
1	Örgryte IS	3	2	0	1	7	4	+3	6	Advance to Knockout stage	—	—	4–1	2–1
2	Halmstads BK	3	2	0	1	5	4	+1	6		2–1	—	—	—
3	AIK	3	1	0	2	4	6	−2	3		—	1–2	—	2–0
4	Syrianska FC	3	1	0	2	3	5	−2	3		—	2–1	—	—

3 March 2013 1	AIK	1–2	Halmstad	Stockholm
13:00 CET (UTC+1)	Milošević (yellow card) 50'; Quaison (yellow card) 77'; Goitom 81' (pen.); Majstorović (yellow card) 87'	Report	Selaković 4'; Magyar 11'; Westerberg (yellow card) 13'	Stadium: Skytteholms IP; Attendance: 3,753; Referee: Johan Hamlin

10 March 2013 2	Örgryte	4–1	AIK	Gothenburg
17:00 CET (UTC+1)	Wallén 5', 71' (yellow card) 52'; Karlsson 37' (yellow card) 77'; Lundgren (yellow card) 39'; Leinar 59'	Report	Quaison (yellow card) 16' (yellow-red card) 90+5' (goal) 72'; Goitom (yellow card) 33'; Borges (yellow card) 78' (yellow-red card) 79'	Stadium: Valhalla IP; Attendance: 1,106; Referee: Kristoffer Karlsson

16 March 2013 3	AIK	2–0	Syrianska	Stockholm
16:00 CET (UTC+1)	Igboananike 25', 79'; Bahoui (yellow card) 36'; Karikari (yellow card) 40' (yellow-red card) 45+1'; Lorentzson (yellow card) 62'	Report	Bååth (yellow card) 64'	Stadium: Skytteholms IP; Attendance: 1,870; Referee: Markus Strömbergsson

==== 2013–14 ====
22 August 2013 Second round	Sandviken	3–2 (a.e.t.)	AIK	Sandviken
19:00 CEST (UTC+2)	Rudolph 45+1'; Åberg 76'; Wanke (yellow card) 101'; Stadler 108'	Report	Bahoui 12', 61'; Ofori (yellow card) 79'	Stadium: Jernvallen; Attendance: 2,859; Referee: Markus Strömbergsson

== Squad statistics ==
As of match played 3 November 2013

=== Appearances and goals ===
No.	Pos	Nat	Player	Total		Allsvenskan		2012–13 Svenska Cupen		2013–14 Svenska Cupen	
No.	Pos	Nat	Player	Apps	Goals	Apps	Goals	Apps	Goals	Apps	Goals
2	DF	(Sweden) SWE	Niklas Backman	11	0	7+3	0	0	0	1	0
3	DF	(Sweden) SWE	Per Karlsson	33	0	30	0	2	0	1	0
4	DF	(Sweden) SWE	Nils-Eric Johansson	32	3	29	3	2	0	1	0
5	MF	(Sweden) SWE	Robert Persson	11	1	1+7	1	1+1	0	1	0
6	DF	(Sweden) SWE	Alexander Milošević	20	0	16+2	0	2	0	0	0
9	FW	(Uganda) UGA	Martin Kayongo-Mutumba	30	2	27+2	2	0	0	0+1	0
10	MF	(Costa Rica) CRC	Celso Borges	27	8	24	8	2	0	0+1	0
11	MF	(Sweden) SWE	Nabil Bahoui	33	9	26+3	7	3	0	1	2
13	GK	(Canada) CAN	Kyriakos Stamatopoulos	27	0	25+1	0	0	0	1	0
15	MF	(Sweden) SWE	Robin Quaison	26	5	15+8	4	2	1	1	0
16	DF	(Sweden) SWE	Martin Lorentzson	30	3	27	3	3	0	0	0
17	MF	(Ghana) GHA	Ebenezer Ofori	5	0	1+3	0	0	0	1	0
19	FW	(Sierra Leone) SLE	Alhassan Kamara	3	0	0+2	0	0	0	1	0
20	MF	(Ghana) GHA	Ibrahim Moro	25	0	16+6	0	1+1	0	1	0
21	FW	(Nigeria) NGA	Kennedy Igboananike	33	16	26+3	14	3	2	1	0
25	MF	(Sweden) SWE	Sam Lundholm	9	0	0+9	0	0	0	0	0
29	MF	(Sweden) SWE	Anton Salétros	1	0	0+1	0	0	0	0	0
36	FW	(Sweden) SWE	Henok Goitom	30	9	25+2	8	2	1	0+1	0
45	DF	(Sweden) SWE	Daniel Majstorović	10	1	7+1	1	2	0	0	0
Players away on loan:
12	FW	(Sweden) SWE	Christian Kouakou	1	0	0	0	0+1	0	0	0
14	MF	(Togo) TOG	Lalawélé Atakora	10	1	2+7	1	0+1	0	0	0
22	FW	(Ghana) GHA	Kwame Karikari	11	0	1+8	0	1+1	0	0	0
24	MF	(Sweden) SWE	Daniel Gustavsson	7	0	3+1	0	1+2	0	0	0
Players who appeared for AIK but left during the season:
7	MF	(Iceland) ISL	Helgi Daníelsson	17	0	15+1	0	1	0	0	0
8	MF	(Sweden) SWE	Daniel Tjernström	1	0	0+1	0	0	0	0	0
27	GK	(Croatia) CRO	Ivan Turina	8	0	5	0	3	0	0	0
28	MF	(Sweden) SWE	Viktor Lundberg	10	0	2+6	0	2	0	0	0

=== Goal scorers ===
Place	Position	Nation	Number	Name	Allsvenskan	2012–13 Svenska Cupen	2013–14 Svenska Cupen	Total
1	FW	(Nigeria)	21	Kennedy Igboananike	14	2	0	16
2	FW	(Sweden)	36	Henok Goitom	8	1	0	9
2	MF	(Sweden)	11	Nabil Bahoui	7	0	2	9
4	MF	(Costa Rica)	10	Celso Borges	8	0	0	8
5	MF	(Sweden)	15	Robin Quaison	4	1	0	5
6	DF	(Sweden)	4	Nils-Eric Johansson	3	0	0	3
6	DF	(Sweden)	16	Martin Lorentzson	3	0	0	3
8	FW	(Uganda)	9	Martin Kayongo-Mutumba	2	0	0	2
9	DF	(Sweden)	45	Daniel Majstorović	1	0	0	1
9	MF	(Sweden)	5	Robert Persson	1	0	0	1
9	MF	(Togo)	14	Lalawélé Atakora	1	0	0	1
9	FW	(Ghana)	22	Kwame Karikari	1	0	0	1
9				Own goal	1	0	0	1
TOTALS					54	4	2	60

=== Clean sheets ===
Place	Position	Nation	Number	Name	Allsvenskan	2012–13 Svenska Cupen	2013–14 Svenska Cupen	Total
1	GK	(Canada)	13	Kyriakos Stamatopoulos	8	0	0	8
2	GK	(Croatia)	27	Ivan Turina	1	0	0	1
TOTALS					9	0	0	9

=== Disciplinary record ===
Number	Nation	Position	Name	Allsvenskan		2012–13 Svenska Cupen		2013–14 Svenska Cupen		Total	
Number	Nation	Position	Name	Booked	Sent off (straight red)	Booked	Sent off (straight red)	Booked	Sent off (straight red)	Booked	Sent off (straight red)
2	(Sweden)	DF	Niklas Backman	1	0	0	0	0	0	1	0
3	(Sweden)	DF	Per Karlsson	2	0	0	0	0	0	2	0
4	(Sweden)	DF	Nils-Eric Johansson	6	0	0	0	0	0	6	0
6	(Sweden)	DF	Alexander Milošević	4	1	1	0	0	0	5	0
9	(Uganda)	FW	Martin Kayongo-Mutumba	1	0	0	0	0	0	1	0
10	(Costa Rica)	MF	Celso Borges	3	0	2	1	0	0	5	1
11	(Sweden)	MF	Nabil Bahoui	2	0	1	0	0	0	3	0
13	(Canada)	GK	Kyriakos Stamatopoulos	1	0	0	0	0	0	1	0
15	(Sweden)	FW	Robin Quaison	2	1	3	1	0	0	5	1
16	(Sweden)	DF	Martin Lorentzson	6	0	1	0	0	0	7	0
17	(Ghana)	MF	Ebenezer Ofori	0	0	0	0	1	0	1	0
20	(Ghana)	MF	Ibrahim Moro	6	0	0	0	0	0	6	0
21	(Nigeria)	FW	Kennedy Igboananike	1	0	0	0	0	0	1	0
36	(Sweden)	FW	Henok Goitom	3	0	1	0	0	0	4	0
45	(Sweden)	DF	Daniel Majstorović	3	0	1	0	0	0	4	0
Players away on loan:
22	(Ghana)	FW	Kwame Karikari	1	0	2	1	0	0	3	1
Players who left AIK during the season:
7	(Iceland)	MF	Helgi Daníelsson	3	0	0	0	0	0	3	0
Total				45	2	12	3	1	0	58	5
