= Celso Borges =

Costa Rican footballer (born 1988)

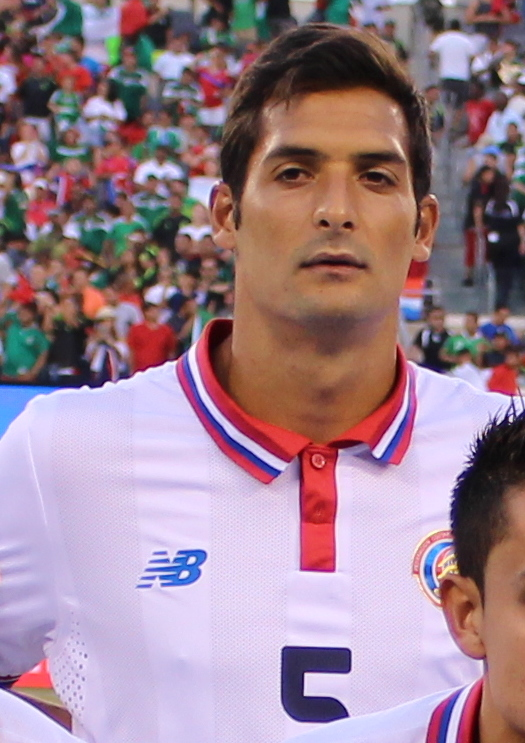
- Borges with Costa Rica at the 2015 CONCACAF Gold Cup

Personal information
- Full name: Celso Borges Mora
- Date of birth: 27 May 1988 (age 38)
- Place of birth: San José, Costa Rica
- Height: 1.82 m (6 ft 0 in)
- Position: Midfielder

Team information
- Current team: Alajuelense
- Number: 5

Youth career
- Saprissa

Senior career*
Years	Team	Apps	(Gls)
2006–2009	Saprissa	86	(7)
2009–2012	Fredrikstad FK	76	(34)
2012–2015	AIK	79	(26)
2015	→ Deportivo La Coruña (loan)	17	(4)
2015–2018	Deportivo La Coruña	90	(12)
2018–2020	Göztepe	53	(2)
2020–2021	Deportivo La Coruña	15	(2)
2021–	Alajuelense	180	(11)

International career^{‡}
2005	Costa Rica U17	4	(1)
2007	Costa Rica U20	3	(0)
2008–	Costa Rica	166	(27)
- * Club domestic league appearances and goals as of 20 September 2026 (UTC) ‡ National team caps and goals as of 5 October 2026 (UTC)

Celso Borges Mora (born 27 May 1988) is a Costa Rican professional footballer who plays as a central midfielder for Liga FPD club Alajuelense and the Costa Rica national team. With 166 international appearances, he is the most capped player in Costa Rica's history.

== Early years ==
His father is Alexandre Guimarães, Brazilian-born, Costa Rican-raised ex-footballer and coach. He was born in Costa Rica's capital city San José and during his high school years, he attended Saint Clare High School, where he also took part in the school's team. His studies were often interrupted by his football training and playing outside the country.

== Club career ==
=== Saprissa ===
At the age of 18, Borges made his professional debut for Saprissa on 15 January 2006. He won five national championships with Saprissa.

=== Fredrikstad FK ===
On 18 January 2009, Fredrikstad FK sporting director Tor-Kristian Karlsen confirmed that Borges had signed for them, joining on 1 July when Borges's contract with Saprissa expired. Fredrikstad later agreed to pay 1 million kroner (€125,000 ) to Deportivo Saprissa so Borges could join the team immediately and play for Fredrikstad, when the season started on 14 April, against the former league champion Stabæk. In March 2011, Borges stated he would leave Fredrikstad during or after the 2011 season.

=== AIK ===
On 1 January 2012, it was confirmed that Borges, as a free agent, was to leave Fredrikstad FK signing a three-year contract with the Swedish football club AIK Stockholm.

He received the vacant number 10 jersey, last worn by Martin Kayongo-Mutumba.

On 1 April 2012, Borges made his first match for AIK, in a match against Mjällby AIF. He got his first goal for the club in the next game, scoring the game-winning goal against Kalmar FF. During the first half of the season he was used as a striker by manager Andreas Alm. But after the summer vacation he dropped down and started playing as a central midfielder and subsequently was the team's first choice in central midfield. He finished the season ending up as the team's best goalscorer.

=== Deportivo La Coruña ===
On 14 January 2015, Borges joined Deportivo de La Coruña, signing with them until the end of the season, with an option of a two-year extension. He scored twice in his first official appearance for Dépor, having started in a 1–2 away win against Rayo Vallecano on 30 January which also marked his La Liga debut.

== International career ==
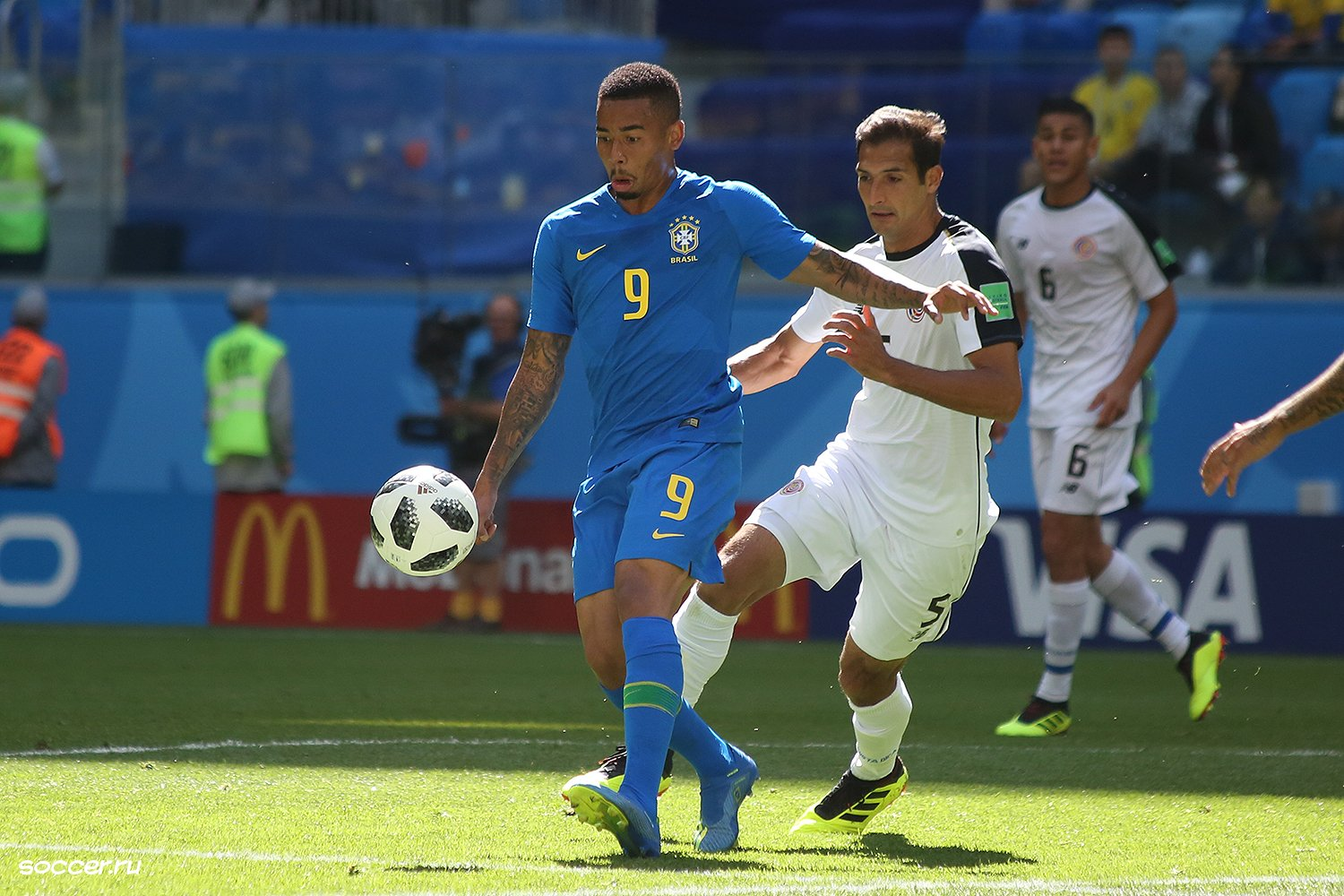
Borges disputing a ball against Brazil's Gabriel Jesus

Borges currently holds the appearance record for the Costa Rica national team with 166 caps, scoring 27 goals. He has represented his country in over 50 FIFA World Cup qualification matches and at the 2014, 2018 and 2022 FIFA World Cup finals. He has also played at the 2011 and 2013 Copa Centroamericana, as well as at the 2009, 2011, 2013, 2015, 2019, 2021 and 2023 CONCACAF Gold Cups, and the Copa América Centenario.

Borges played in the 2005 FIFA U-17 World Championship held in Peru, in which he scored a goal and was considered among the best players of the tournament. After the tournament he was picked as one of ten players to watch out for in the future. Borges also participated in the 2007 FIFA U-20 World Cup held in Canada.

He made his debut for the Costa Rican senior team in a June 2008 FIFA World Cup qualification match against Grenada and, in September of the same year, scored his first international goal against Suriname.

After featuring prominently during the team's unsuccessful 2010 FIFA World Cup qualification campaign, Borges helped the team to a second-place finish at the 2011 Copa Centroamericana, as well as the quarter-finals of the CONCACAF Gold Cup later that year.

In June 2014, Borges was named in Costa Rica's squad for the 2014 FIFA World Cup. During the round of 16, Borges was the first of five Costa Rican players to successfully convert his kick in a 5–3 penalty shootout win over Greece.

In May 2018 he was named in Costa Rica's 23 man squad for the 2018 FIFA World Cup in Russia.

== Personal life ==
Through his father, Borges was also a Brazilian national until 2017, when he relinquished his Brazilian nationality to become a Spanish citizen.

Borges is usually considered one of the most educated players of the Costa Rica national football team. El País' Diego Torres described him as "the brain of Costa Rica" and "a gleaned midfielder with elegant diction", while La Nación's Antonio Alfaro called him "the exemplary Costa Rican player." Aside from his native Spanish, Borges can also speak English, Portuguese and Swedish.

A heavy metal fan, citing Slipknot, Metallica, Dream Theater and Killswitch Engage as his favorite bands, Borges plays the drums, and has covered System of a Down's "Toxicity" alongside Peruvian musician Kurt Dyer.

== Career statistics ==
=== Club ===
As of match played 20 September 2026

Appearances and goals by club, season and competition
Club	Season	League			Cup		Continental		Other		Total	
Club	Season	Division	Apps	Goals	Apps	Goals	Apps	Goals	Apps	Goals	Apps	Goals
Saprissa	2005–06	Liga FPD	2	0	—		—		—		2	0
Saprissa	2006–07	Liga FPD	35	2	—		—		—		35	2
Saprissa	2007–08	Liga FPD	25	0	—		6 (Note: Appearance(s) in CONCACAF Champions League)	1	—		31	1
Saprissa	2008–09	Liga FPD	24	5	—		5	1	—		29	6
Saprissa	Total		86	7	—		11	2	—		97	9
Fredrikstad FK	2009	Tippeligaen	22	7	2	1	1 (Note: Appearance(s) in UEFA Europa League)	1	—		25	9
Fredrikstad FK	2010	Adeccoligaen	29	14	2	1	—		—		31	15
Fredrikstad FK	2011	Tippeligaen	25	8	5	7	—		—		30	15
Fredrikstad FK	Total		76	29	9	9	1	1	—		86	39
AIK	2012	Allsvenskan	29	8	—		12	1	—		41	9
AIK	2013	Allsvenskan	24	8	3	0	—		—		27	8
AIK	2014	Allsvenskan	26	6	—		3	0	—		29	6
AIK	Total		79	22	3	0	15	1	—		97	23
Deportivo La Coruña (loan)	2014–15	La Liga	17	3	—		—		—		17	3
Deportivo La Coruña	2015–16	La Liga	24	3	—		—		—		24	3
Deportivo La Coruña	2016–17	La Liga	34	6	4	0	—		—		38	6
Deportivo La Coruña	2017–18	La Liga	32	3	—		—		—		32	3
Deportivo La Coruña	Total		107	15	4	0	—		—		111	15
Göztepe	2018–19	Süper Lig	32	1	3	1	—		—		35	2
Göztepe	2019–20	Süper Lig	21	1	6	0	—		—		27	1
Göztepe	Total		53	2	9	1	—		—		62	3
Deportivo La Coruña	2020–21	Segunda División B	15	2	2	0	—		5 (Note: Appearances in Segunda División B play-offs)	0	22	2
Deportivo La Coruña	Deportivo total		122	17	6	0	—		5	0	133	17
Alajuelense	2021–22	Liga FPD	21	2	—		1 (Note: Appearance in CONCACAF League)	0	—		22	2
Alajuelense	2022–23	Liga FPD	34	2	—		10 (Note: One appearance in CONCACAF Champions Cup, nine appearances and one goal in CONCACAF League)	1	—		44	3
Alajuelense	2023–24	Liga FPD	42	0	2	0	12 (Note: Two appearances in CONCACAF Champions Cup, ten appearances and one goal in CONCACAF Central American Cup)	1	—		56	1
Alajuelense	2024–25	Liga FPD	45	5	2	0	2 (Note: Appearances in CONCACAF Champions Cup)	0	1 (Note: Appearance in Supercopa de Costa Rica)	0	50	5
Alajuelense	2025–26	Liga FPD	29	1	0	0	11 (Note: Two appearances in CONCACAF Champions Cup, nine appearances in CONCACAF Central American Cup)	0	1	0	41	1
Alajuelense	2026–27	Liga FPD	9	1	0	0	6 (Note: Appearances in CONCACAF Central American Cup)	0	1	0	16	1
Alajuelense	Total		180	11	4	0	31	1	4	0	219	12
Career total			596	88	31	10	69	6	8	0	704	104

=== International ===
As of match played 5 October 2026

Appearances and goals by national team and year
National team	Year	Apps	Goals
Costa Rica	2008	7	2
Costa Rica	2009	15	5
Costa Rica	2010	3	0
Costa Rica	2011	10	1
Costa Rica	2012	5	1
Costa Rica	2013	20	5
Costa Rica	2014	13	5
Costa Rica	2015	14	0
Costa Rica	2016	11	2
Costa Rica	2017	10	0
Costa Rica	2018	10	0
Costa Rica	2019	12	2
Costa Rica	2020	1	0
Costa Rica	2021	15	3
Costa Rica	2022	12	1
Costa Rica	2023	5	0
Costa Rica	2024	0	0
Costa Rica	2025	1	0
Costa Rica	2026	2	0
Total		166	27

Scores and results list Costa Rica's goal tally first, score column indicates score after each Borges goal (includes unofficial goals scored).

List of international goals scored by Celso Borges
No.	Date	Venue	Opponent	Score	Result	Competition
1.	6 September 2008	Estadio Ricardo Saprissa Aymá, San José, Costa Rica	Suriname	5–0	7–0	2010 FIFA World Cup qualification
2.	11 October 2008	André Kamperveen Stadion, Paramaribo, Suriname	Suriname	2–0	4–1	2010 FIFA World Cup qualification
3.	3 June 2009	Estádio Ricardo Saprissa Aymá, San José, Costa Rica	United States	2–0	3–1	2010 FIFA World Cup qualification
4.	6 June 2009	Dwight Yorke Stadium, Bacolet, Trinidad and Tobago	Trinidad and Tobago	2–1	3–2	2010 FIFA World Cup qualification
5.	6 June 2009	Dwight Yorke Stadium, Bacolet, Trinidad and Tobago	Trinidad and Tobago	3–2	3–2	2010 FIFA World Cup qualification
6.	7 July 2009	Mapfre Stadium, Columbus, United States	Jamaica	1–0	1–0	2009 CONCACAF Gold Cup
7.	19 July 2009	AT&T Stadium, Arlington, United States	Guadeloupe	1–0	5–1	2009 CONCACAF Gold Cup
8.	21 January 2011	Estadio Rommel Fernández, Panama City, Panama	Panama	1–0	1–1	2011 Copa Centroamericana
9.	16 October 2012	Estadio Nacional, San José, Costa Rica	Guyana	6–0	7–0	2014 FIFA World Cup qualification
10.	20 January 2013	Estadio Nacional, San José, Costa Rica	Nicaragua	2–0	2–0	2013 Copa Centroamericana
11.	19 June 2013	Estadio Nacional, San José, Costa Rica	Panama	2–0	2–0	2014 FIFA World Cup qualification
12.	14 August 2013	Estadio Quisqueya, Santo Domingo, Dominican Republic	Dominican Republic	1–0	4–0	Friendly
13.	14 August 2013	Estadio Quisqueya, Santo Domingo, Dominican Republic	Dominican Republic	2–0	4–0	Friendly
14.	6 September 2013	Estadio Nacional, San José, Costa Rica	United States	2–0	3–1	2014 FIFA World Cup qualification
15.	6 June 2014	PPL Park, Chester, United States	Republic of Ireland	1–1	1–1	Friendly
16.	3 September 2014	Robert F. Kennedy Memorial Stadium, Washington D.C., United States	Nicaragua	1–0	3–0	2014 Copa Centroamericana
17.	7 September 2014	Cotton Bowl, Dallas, United States	Panama	1–2	2–2	2014 Copa Centroamericana
18.	14 October 2014	Seoul World Cup Stadium, Seoul, South Korea	South Korea	1–0	3–1	Friendly
19.	14 October 2014	Seoul World Cup Stadium, Seoul, South Korea	South Korea	2–1	3–1	Friendly
20.	29 March 2016	Estadio Nacional, San José, Costa Rica	Jamaica	1–0	3–0	2018 FIFA World Cup qualification
21.	11 June 2016	NRG Stadium, Houston, United States	Colombia	3–1	3–2	Copa América Centenario
22.	16 June 2019	Estadio Nacional, San José, Costa Rica	Nicaragua	2–0	4–0	2019 CONCACAF Gold Cup
23.	6 September 2019	Estadio Nacional, San José, Costa Rica	Uruguay	1–1	1–2	Friendly
24.	12 July 2021	Exploria Stadium, Orlando, United States	Guadeloupe	3–1	3–1	2021 CONCACAF Gold Cup
25.	16 July 2021	Exploria Stadium, Orlando, United States	Suriname	2–1	2–1	2021 CONCACAF Gold Cup
26.	10 October 2021	Estadio Nacional, San José, Costa Rica	El Salvador	2–1	2–1	2022 FIFA World Cup qualification
27.	24 March 2022	Estadio Nacional, San José, Costa Rica	Canada	1–0	1–0	2022 FIFA World Cup qualification

== Honours ==
Deportivo Saprissa

- Liga FPD: Apertura 2005, Clausura 2006, Apertura 2006, Clausura 2007, Apertura 2007, Clausura 2008, Apertura 2008

Alajuelense

- CONCACAF Central American Cup: 2023, 2024

Costa Rica

- Copa Centroamericana: 2013, 2014

Individual

- CONCACAF Gold Cup All-Tournament Team: 2009
- CONCACAF Gold Cup Best XI: 2021

== See also ==
- List of men's footballers with 100 or more international caps
