= Leandersson =

Leandersson is a Swedish surname. Notable people with the surname include:

- Bengt Leandersson, Swedish ski-orienteering competitor
- Jonas Leandersson, Swedish orienteering competitor
- Lina Leandersson (born 1995), Swedish actress
- Gösta Leandersson (1918–1995), Swedish marathon runner
- Romeo Leandersson (born 2008), Swedish footballer
- Tomas Leandersson (1966–2021), Swedish ten-pin bowler
- William Leandersson (born 1984), Swedish footballer
