= Martin Lorentzson =

Swedish footballer (born 1984)

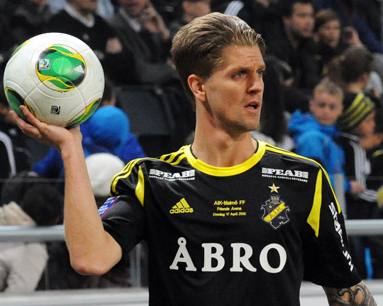
- Lorentzson in 2013 with AIK

Personal information
- Full name: Martin Olof Lorentzson
- Date of birth: 21 July 1984 (age 42)
- Place of birth: Östertälje, Sweden
- Height: 1.79 m (5 ft 10 in)
- Position: Right-back

Youth career
- Östertälje

Senior career*
Years	Team	Apps	(Gls)
2005–2007	Sleipner	20	(2)
2007–2009	Assyriska Föreningen	77	(5)
2010–2014	AIK	127	(11)
2015	Åtvidabergs FF	17	(0)
2015–2016	Coventry City	7	(0)
2016–2019	Örebro SK	84	(1)
Total		332	(19)

International career
2013	Sweden	1	(0)
- * Club domestic league appearances and goals

Martin Olof Lorentzson (born 21 July 1984) is a Swedish former professional footballer who played as a right-back. He earned one international cap for Sweden.

== Career ==
Lorentzson started his professional football career in Norrköping with IK Sleipner. In 2007, he left Sleipner and joined Södertälje side Assyriska Föreningen.

In the summer of 2009, AIK, Swedish champions of 2009, announced that Lorentzson would join them in 2010. He enjoyed a successful career at AIK and was fan favourite known as 'Lorenzo' and 'The Swedish Zanetti'. He was also vice captain in his final season. In October 2014 AIK announced that they were not extending Lorentzson's contract even though he himself wanted to stay.

Lorentzson made his debut for Coventry City on 30 January 2016 against Scunthorpe United at the Ricoh Arena. At the conclusion of the season, the Sky Blues announced that he would not be retained upon the conclusion of his contract.

== Style of play ==
Lorentzson is known for his pace, stamina, crossing and aerial prowess from set pieces. [2] During match against Malmö in 2011 he broke the Allsvenskan's all-time record of kilometres covered in a game. In his earlier career whilst playing for Assyriska Föreningen he operated as a right-forward and right wing back and he has played in the centre back and defensive midfield positions for AIK. The latter being a position he expressed a desire to adapt his game to as he gets older.

== Career statistics ==
As of 18 April 2016

Appearances and goals by club, season and competition
Club	Season	League			National cup		League cup		Other		Total	
Club	Season	Division	Apps	Goals	Apps	Goals	Apps	Goals	Apps	Goals	Apps	Goals
IK Sleipner	2006	Division 2 Norra Götaland	20	2	0	0	0	0	0	0	20	2
Assyriska	2007	Division 1 Norra	21	0	0	0	0	0	0	0	21	0
Assyriska	2008	Superettan	29	4	0	0	0	0	0	0	29	4
Assyriska	2009	Superettan	27	1	0	0	0	0	2 (Note: Appearances in 2009 Allsvenskan relegation play-offs)	0	27	1
Assyriska	Total		77	5	0	0	0	0	2	0	77	5
AIK	2010	Allsvenskan	14	0	3	1	0	0	2 (Note: Appearances in UEFA Europa League)	0	19	1
AIK	2011	Allsvenskan	29	1	1	0	0	0	0	0	30	1
AIK	2012	Allsvenskan	29	4	1	0	0	0	12	3	42	7
AIK	2013	Allsvenskan	27	3	3	0	0	0	0	0	30	3
AIK	2014	Allsvenskan	28	3	1	0	0	0	4	0	33	3
AIK	Total		127	11	9	1	0	0	18	3	154	15
Åtvidabergs FF	2015	Allsvenskan	17	0	0	0	0	0	0	0	17	0
Coventry City	2015–16	League One	7	0	0	0	0	0	0	0	7	0
Career total			248	18	9	1	0	0	20	3	277	22
