= James Frempong =

Swedish professional footballer

Personal information
- Date of birth: 11 January 1989 (age 37)
- Place of birth: Sweden
- Height: 1.72 m (5 ft 8 in)
- Position: Left winger

Senior career*
Years	Team	Apps	(Gls)
2005–2009	Örebro SK Ungdom	5	(1)
2007–2009	Örebro SK	5	(0)
2008	→ Brommapojkarna (loan)	16	(2)
2010–2011	Gefle IF	31	(0)
2011–2014	IFK Norrköping	12	(1)

International career
2004–2006	Sweden U17	10	(1)
2007–2008	Sweden U19	7	(1)
- * Club domestic league appearances and goals

James Frempong (born 11 January 1989) is a Swedish former professional footballer who played as a midfielder.

== Career ==
In 2008, Frempong was loaned to Superettan side IF Brommapojkarna, with which he promoted.

On the 26 August 2009, it was announced that Frempong will be on trial with Watford, as his contract with Örebro SK ended in November 2009.

On 27 October 2010, it emerged Celtic had watched Frempong in action for Gefle IF in a match against GAIS. Frempong was quoted afterwards as being "excited" at the Scottish club's interest.

On 9 August 2011 it was announced that he will join IFK Norrköping on a 3.5 year deal.
