= Olof Mård =

Swedish footballer

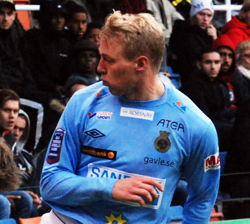

Personal information
- Full name: Nils Olof Mård
- Date of birth: 31 January 1989 (age 37)
- Place of birth: Sweden
- Height: 1.92 m (6 ft 3 1/2 in)
- Position: Defender

Team information
- Current team: Sandvikens IF
- Number: 23

Youth career
- Valbo FF

Senior career*
Years	Team	Apps	(Gls)
2008	Sandvikens IF	19	(0)
2009–2015	Gefle IF	85	(2)
2015–2021	Sandvikens IF	121	(8)
- * Club domestic league appearances and goals as of 6 April 2017

Nils Olof Mård (born 31 January 1989) is a Swedish former footballer who played as a defender.
