= 2005–06 Primera División (Costa Rica) =

Costa Rican Primera División
- Season: 2005–06
- Champions: -
- Relegated: -
- -: -

Primera División de Costa Rica (Costa Rica First Division) is a Costa Rican football tournament composed of two short tournaments that take up the entire year to determine the champion of Costa Rican football.

In both the Apertura and Clausura, 2 groups of 6 teams are conformed, they will play twice (Home and away) with the teams of their own group (10 games) and once game with the teams of the other group (6 games), for a total of 16 games. The top 2 teams from each group after the final round of the Apertura and the Clausura qualify for the playoffs.

== Apertura 2005 ==
=== Group stage ===
Group A
Pos	Team	Pld	W	D	L	GF	GA	GD	Pts	Qualification
1	Alajuelense	16	9	5	2	29	9	+20	32	Qualified to the playoffs
2	Puntarenas F.C.	16	8	4	4	23	15	+8	28	Qualified to the playoffs
3	Herediano	16	8	4	4	23	16	+7	28	
4	Santacrucena	16	6	2	8	17	19	−2	20	
5	Liberia	16	2	2	12	9	33	−24	8	
6	Ramonense	16	0	3	13	7	32	−25	3	

Group B
Pos	Team	Pld	W	D	L	GF	GA	GD	Pts	Qualification
1	Saprissa	16	11	4	1	28	12	+16	37	Qualified to the playoffs
2	Pérez Zeledón	16	7	5	4	21	18	+3	26	Qualified to the playoffs
3	Cartaginés	16	7	4	5	30	22	+8	25	
4	Brujas F.C.	16	6	7	3	16	12	+4	25	
5	Santos	16	5	6	5	22	23	−1	21	
6	Carmelita	16	2	4	10	11	25	−14	10	

=== Playoffs ===
Semifinals					Finals
1A	Alajuelense	0	1	1 (4)
2B	Perez Zeledon	1	0	1 (5)	Saprissa	1	1	1 (4)
1B	Saprissa	0	4	4	Perez Zeledon	1	1	1 (2)
2A	Puntarenas F.C.	2	1	3

Apertura 2005 winners
Saprissa

== Clausura 2006 ==
=== Group stage ===
Group A
Pos	Team	Pld	W	D	L	GF	GA	GD	Pts	Qualification
1	Puntarenas F.C.	16	11	4	1	29	12	+17	37	Qualified to the playoffs
2	Saprissa	16	10	3	3	22	16	+6	33	Qualified to the playoffs
3	Liberia	16	10	2	4	28	18	+10	32	
4	Herediano	16	7	2	7	19	18	+1	23	
5	Ramonense	16	6	1	9	16	19	−3	19	
6	Santacrucena	16	2	1	13	9	29	−20	7	

Group B
Pos	Team	Pld	W	D	L	GF	GA	GD	Pts	Qualification
1	Brujas F.C.	16	7	3	6	19	17	+2	24	Qualified to the playoffs
2	Alajuelense	16	7	2	7	20	15	+5	23	Qualified to the playoffs
3	Pérez Zeledón	16	6	4	6	20	16	+4	22	
4	Carmelita	16	5	4	7	18	19	−1	19	
5	Cartaginés	16	4	5	7	15	22	−7	17	
6	Santos	16	4	3	9	15	29	−14	15	

=== Playoffs ===
Semifinals					Finals
1A	Puntarenas F.C.	0	1	1
2B	Alajuelense	2	1	3	Saprissa	1	2	3
1B	Brujas F.C.	0	1	1	Alajuelense	1	1	2
2A	Saprissa	1	2	3

Clausura 2006 winners
Saprissa

== Final ==
No Final was played as Saprissa won both the Apertura and Clausura tournaments.

Primera División de Costa Rica 2005-06
Saprissa
25th title

== Aggregate table ==
Pos	Team	Pld	W	D	L	GF	GA	GD	Pts	Qualification or relegation
1	Saprissa	32	21	7	4	50	28	+22	70	Primera División Champion 2005-06
2	Puntarenas F.C.	32	19	8	5	52	28	+24	65	
3	Alajuelense	32	16	7	9	49	24	+25	55	
4	Herediano	32	15	6	11	42	34	+8	51	
5	Brujas F.C.	32	13	10	9	35	29	+6	49	
6	Pérez Zeledón	32	13	9	10	41	34	+7	48	
7	Cartaginés	32	11	9	12	45	44	+1	42	
8	Liberia	32	12	4	16	37	51	−14	40	
9	Santos	32	9	9	14	37	52	−15	36	
10	Carmelita	32	7	8	17	29	44	−15	29	
11	Santacrucena	32	8	3	21	26	48	−22	27	
12	Ramonense	32	6	4	22	23	51	−28	22	Relegated to Segunda Division
