= Sal Jobarteh =

Gambian footballer

Personal information
- Full name: Sulayman Jobarteh
- Date of birth: 9 March 1993 (age 33)
- Place of birth: Huddinge, Sweden
- Height: 1.79 m (5 ft 10 in)
- Position: Midfielder

Team information
- Current team: Haninge
- Number: 6

Youth career
- 2007–2008: Brommapojkarna
- 2008–2011: AIK

Senior career*
Years	Team	Apps	(Gls)
2011–2014	AIK	0	(0)
2011–2012	→ Eskilstuna (loan)	22	(1)
2012–2014	→ Sirius (loan)	12	(0)
2013	→ Eskilstuna (loan)	14	(1)
201	→ Dalkurd (loan)	9	(0)
2014–2016	Moss	36	(0)
2015	→ Fredrikstad (loan)	7	(0)
2016–2018	Nyköping	36	(1)
2018–2019	Assyriska	24	(0)
2019	Nyköping	14	(0)
2019–2020	San Roque	4	(0)
2020–	Haninge	124	(7)

International career^{‡}
2011–2012	Sweden U19	5	(0)
2019	Gambia	1	(0)
- * Club domestic league appearances and goals as of 8 May 2025 ‡ National team caps and goals as of 13 October 2019

Sulayman "Sal" Jobarteh (born 9 March 1993) is a footballer who plays as a midfielder for IFK Haninge. Born in Sweden, Jobarteh represents the Gambia national football team.

== International career ==
Jobarteh was born in Sweden and is of Gambian descent. He debuted for the Gambia national football team in a 1-0 friendly win over Guinea on 7 June 2019.

== Personal life ==
Jobarteh is the brother of the professional footballer Alagie Sosseh.
