= Daniel Gustavsson =

Swedish footballer

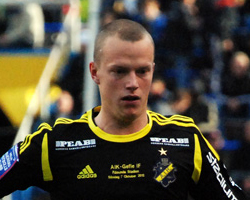

Personal information
- Full name: Hans Daniel Gustavsson
- Date of birth: 29 August 1990 (age 36)
- Place of birth: Kungsör, Sweden
- Height: 1.77 m (5 ft 10 in)
- Position: Right winger

Youth career
- IF Rune
- Kungsör BK

Senior career*
Years	Team	Apps	(Gls)
2006–2007	Kungsör BK		
2008	Västerås SK	22	(3)
2009–2013	AIK	53	(3)
2009	→ Väsby United (loan)	15	(1)
2009	→ Västerås SK (loan)	5	(2)
2010	→ Väsby United (loan)	16	(2)
2011	→ Väsby United (loan)	1	(0)
2013–2016	Örebro	91	(19)
2016–2019	Elfsborg	64	(10)
2019–2021	Lillestrøm	82	(10)
2022	Örebro	23	(1)

International career
2007	Sweden U16	3	(0)
2009	Sweden U19	2	(0)
- * Club domestic league appearances and goals

Daniel Gustavsson (born 29 August 1990) is a Swedish former footballer.

== Career ==
Gustavsson is a midfielder who playing during his AIK career on loan in the 2009 season time with FC Väsby United and Västerås SK.

On 10 December 2013, Gustavsson signed a three-year contract with Örebro which made his move to the club permanently.

In January 2019, Gustavsson moved to Lillestrøm in Norway.

On 5 January 2022, Gustavsson returned to Örebro on a two-year contract with an option for third year.

== Honours ==
=== AIK ===
- Allsvenskan: 2009
- Svenska Cupen: 2009
