= Christian Kouakou (footballer, born 1995) =

Swedish footballer (born 1995)

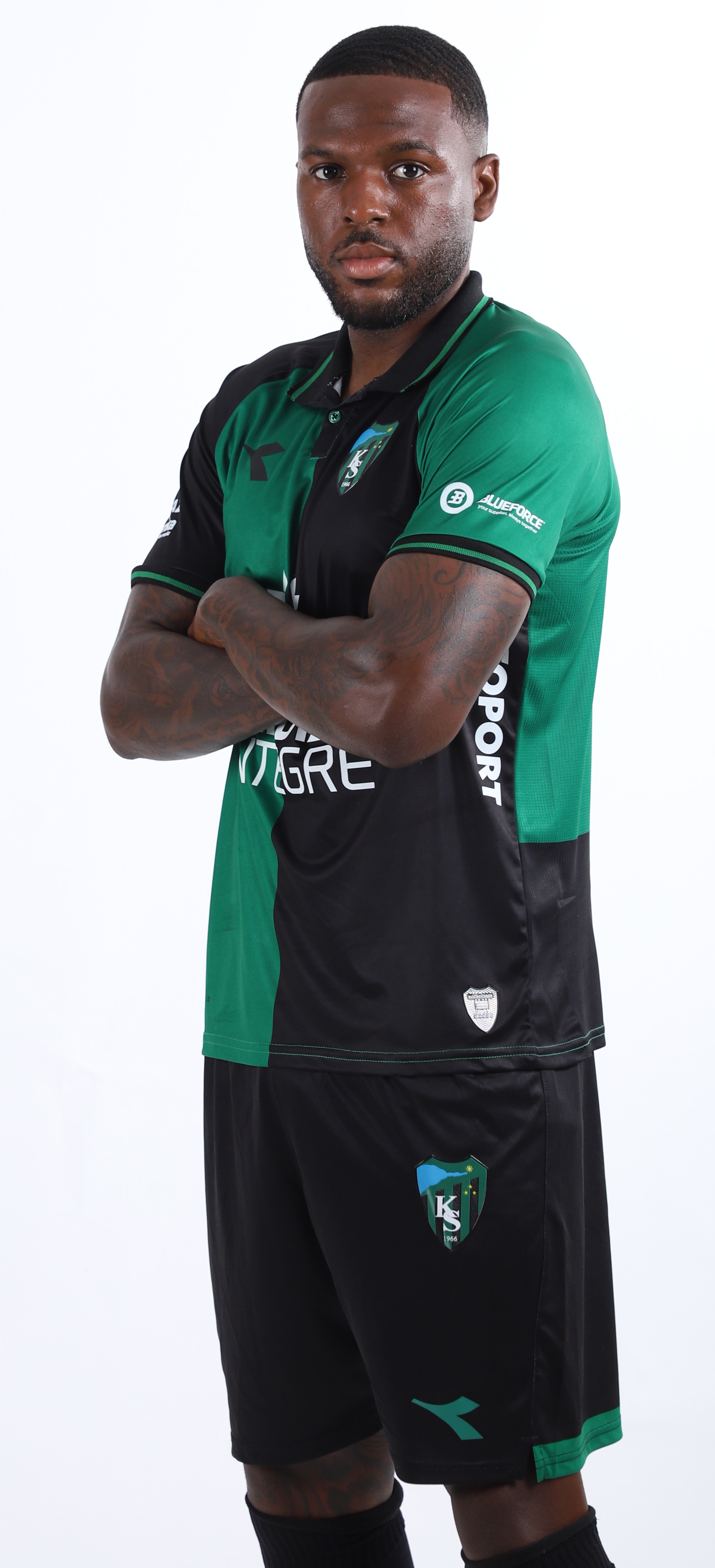
- Kouakou with Kocaelispor in 2023

Personal information
- Full name: Onil Christian Kouakou
- Date of birth: 20 April 1995 (age 31)
- Place of birth: Solna, Sweden
- Height: 1.80 m (5 ft 11 in)
- Position: Forward

Team information
- Current team: Östers IF
- Number: 7

Youth career
- –2011: AIK

Senior career*
Years	Team	Apps	(Gls)
2011–2013	AIK	7	(0)
2012	→ Akropolis IF (loan)	8	(1)
2013	→ Mjällby AIF (loan)	0	(0)
2014–2016	IF Brommapojkarna	28	(4)
2017–2018	Nyköpings BIS	39	(29)
2018–2020	IK Brage	36	(20)
2020	IFK Göteborg	7	(0)
2021–2023	IK Sirius	61	(19)
2023–2024	Kocaelispor	19	(1)
2025–	Östers IF	8	(0)

International career
2010–2012	Sweden U17	18	(8)
2012–2014	Sweden U19	10	(4)
- * Club domestic league appearances and goals as of 21 July 2026

Onil Christian Kouakou (born 20 April 1995) is a Swedish professional footballer who plays as a forward for Östers IF.

== Career ==
Kouakou made his debut in Allsvenskan on 17 June 2011, when in the 88th minute he was substituted for Teteh Bangura, in an away win over Gefle IF. Kouakou became the youngest AIK player to ever feature in Allsvenskan.

During the first half of the 2012 season, he made three appearances in the first team. He was then loaned out to Akropolis IF for the rest of the season. During his stay there, he made a total of eight appearances and scored once.

On 3 April 2013, it was announced that Kouakou was joining Mjällby AIF on loan.

On 8 August 2018, after a successful stint at Nyköpings BIS, Kouakou joined IK Brage in Superettan.

On 29 January 2025, Kouakou signed a two-season contract with Östers IF.

== Career statistics ==
As of 31 December 2013

Appearances and goals by club, season and competition
Club	Season	League			Cup		Continental		Total	
Club	Season	Division	Apps	Goals	Apps	Goals	Apps	Goals	Apps	Goals
AIK	2011	Allsvenskan	1	0	—		—		1	0
AIK	2012	Allsvenskan	3	0	—		—		3	0
Akropolis IF	2012	Division 1	8	1	—		—		8	1
Mjällby AIF	2013	Allsvenskan	0	0	0	0	0	0	0	0
AIK	2013	Allsvenskan	3	0	1	0	0	0	4	0
Career total			15	1	1	0	0	0	16	1
