= Helgi Daníelsson (footballer, born 1981) =

Icelandic footballer (born 1981)

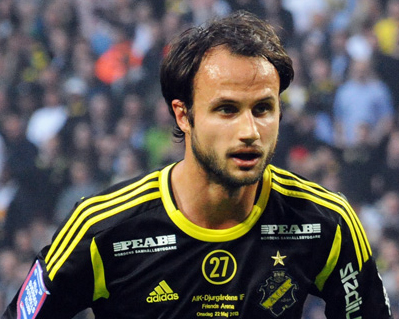
- Helgi playing for AIK in 2013

Personal information
- Full name: Helgi Valur Daníelsson
- Date of birth: 13 July 1981 (age 45)
- Place of birth: Uppsala, Sweden
- Height: 1.87 m (6 ft 2 in)
- Position: Defensive midfielder

Team information
- Current team: March Town (A)

Youth career
- Fylkir

Senior career*
Years	Team	Apps	(Gls)
1998	Fylkir	1	(0)
1998–2003	Peterborough United	55	(2)
2000	→ Fylkir (loan)	16	(1)
2003–2005	Fylkir	52	(4)
2006–2007	Öster	48	(5)
2008–2009	Elfsborg	52	(1)
2010	Hansa Rostock	12	(0)
2010–2013	AIK	75	(2)
2013–2014	Belenenses	28	(0)
2014–2015	AGF	21	(1)
2018–2021	Fylkir	54	(5)
2024–	March Town United F.C.	41	(6)

International career
1996–1998	Iceland U-17	15	(0)
1999	Iceland U-19	6	(0)
2000–2003	Iceland U-21	17	(1)
2001–2014	Iceland	33	(0)
- * Club domestic league appearances and goals as of 13 October 2021

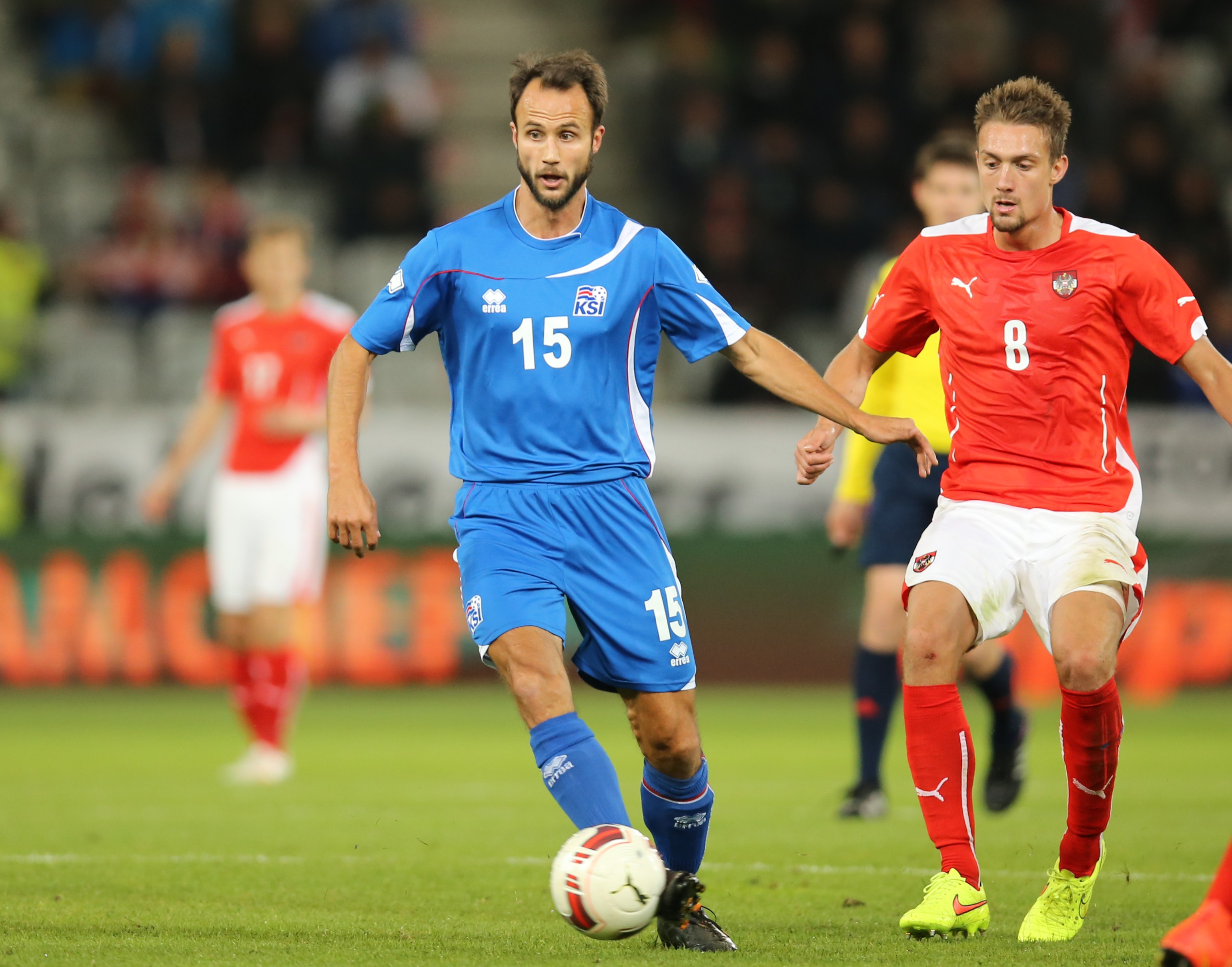
Helgi in 2014

Helgi Valur Daníelsson (Icelandic pronunciation: [ˈhɛlkɪ ˈtʰanɪjɛlsɔn]; born 13 July 1981] is an Icelandic former professional footballer and a chemist who played as a defensive midfielder. He played professionally in England, Sweden, Germany, Portugal, Iceland, and Denmark during a career that spanned between 1998 and 2021. A full international between 2001 and 2014, he won 33 caps for the Iceland national team. As of 2022, Helgi is pursuing a Ph.D. degree in radiochemistry at the University of Cambridge

== Club career ==
In 2006, he left Fylkir who he had joined from Peterborough United for £25,000 in 2003, to go to Sweden to play for Östers IF in Allsvenskan.

On 12 December 2007, Helgi signed a contract with IF Elfsborg. On 22 January 2010, he left Elfsborg and joined Second Bundesliga club Hansa Rostock. After just a few months in the German side, he signed a deal with reigning Swedish champions AIK. On 2 July 2013, it was announced that he would transfer to Primeira Liga side Belenenses after AIK's game vs. Häcken on 22 July.

On 27 August 2014, Helgi terminated his contract with Belenenses for personal reason's. Two days later he signed a 2-year contract for the Danish 1. division side AGF.

== International career ==
A defensive midfielder, Helgi has played for the Iceland national football team at youth and senior level.

== Career statistics ==
Club	Season	Division	League		Cup		Europe		Total	
Club	Season	Division	Apps	Goals	Apps	Goals	Apps	Goals	Apps	Goals
Fylkir	1998	1. deild karla								
Peterborough	2000–01	Second Division	6	0	—		—		6	0
Peterborough	2001–02	Second Division	31	2	—		—		31	2
Peterborough	2002–03	Second Division	18	0	2	0	—		20	0
Fylkir	2003	Úrvalsdeild	16	1	3	0	—		19	1
Fylkir	2004	Úrvalsdeild	18	1	2	0	2	0	22	1
Fylkir	2005	Úrvalsdeild	18	2	4	1	—		22	3
Östers IF	2006	Allsvenskan	20	1	—		—		20	1
Östers IF	2007	Superettan	28	4	—		—		28	4
IF Elfsborg	2008	Allsvenskan	24	0	—		6	0	30	0
IF Elfsborg	2009	Allsvenskan	28	1	2	0	—		30	1
F.C. Hansa Rostock	2009–10	2. Bundesliga	12	0	—		—		12	0
AIK	2010	Allsvenskan	15	0	2	0	6	1	23	1
AIK	2011	Allsvenskan	25	1	1	0	—		26	1
AIK	2012	Allsvenskan	19	1	1	0	12	2	32	3
AIK	2013	Allsvenskan	16	0	1	0	—		17	0
Belenenses	2013–14	Primeira Liga	26	0	0	0	—		26	0
Belenenses	2014–15	Primeira Liga	2	0	0	0	—		2	0
AGF	2014–15	NordicBet Ligaen	21	1	0	0	—		21	1
Fylkir	2018	Úrvalsdeild	13	0	0	0	—		13	0
Fylkir	2019	Úrvalsdeild	20	4	2	0	—		22	4
Career Total			376	19	18	1	26	3	400	23
