= Omar Jawo =

Gambian-Swedish footballer

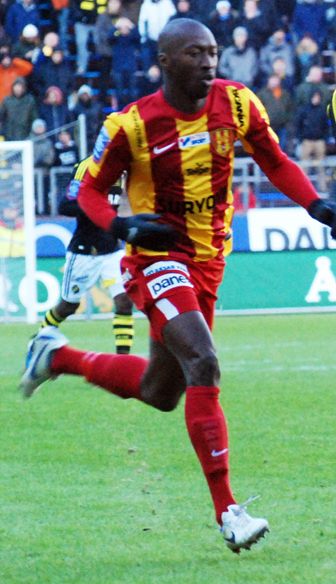

Personal information
- Date of birth: 8 November 1981 (age 45)
- Place of birth: Banjul, Gambia
- Height: 1.88 m (6 ft 2 in)
- Position: Defender

Youth career
- 2000–2001: Assyriska FF

Senior career*
| Years | Team | Apps | (Gls) |
| 2002 | Assyriska FF | 2 | (0) |
| 2003 | IK Frej | 5 | (0) |
| 2003–2004 | Vallentuna BK | 40 | (1) |
| 2005–2008 | Väsby United | 80 | (4) |
| 2009–2010 | Gefle IF | 49 | (0) |
| 2011–2012 | Syrianska FC | 40 | (0) |
| 2013–2015 | AFC United | 70 | (4) |
| 2016 | IF Brommapojkarna | 13 | (0) |

International career
| 2010–2011 | Gambia | 6 | (1) |
- * Club domestic league appearances and goals as of 2 January 2017

Omar Jawo (born 8 November 1981 in Banjul) is a Gambian-Swedish footballer who plays as a defender.

== Career ==
Jawo began his youth career with Assyriska FF. He earned his first two professional caps with the squad in 2002, before signing with IK Frej in 2003. After one season with IK Frej he was sold to Vallentuna BK where he played one year. He signed than in February 2005 for Väsby United and played 80 games, who scored four goals before signed in February 2009 for Gefle IF. In 2016, he signed a one-year contract with Brommapojkarna.

== Personal life ==
Omar's brother Amadou Jawo plays currently for Stockholm based Djurgårdens IF. His two youngest brothers, Momodou Jawo and Ebrima "Mabou" Jawo are also footballers.
