= Magnus Wikström =

Swedish footballer

Personal information
- Date of birth: 7 December 1977 (age 48)
- Place of birth: Sweden
- Height: 1.95 m (6 ft 5 in)
- Position: Defender

Youth career
- BK Forward

Senior career*
Years	Team	Apps	(Gls)
–2003	BK Forward	28	(5)
2004	GIF Sundsvall	29	(0)
2005–2006	Gefle IF	48	(1)
2007–2014	Örebro SK	170	(11)
- * Club domestic league appearances and goals as of 11 December 2011

Magnus Wikström (born 7 December 1977) is a Swedish former footballer.
