= Ibrahim Moro =

Ghanaian footballer (born 1993)

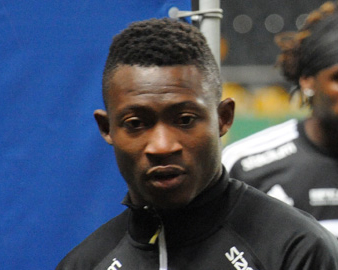
- Moro in 2013

Personal information
- Date of birth: 10 November 1993 (age 33)
- Place of birth: Accra, Ghana
- Height: 1.79 m (5 ft 10 in)
- Position: Midfielder

Team information
- Current team: Rajasthan United

Senior career*
Years	Team	Apps	(Gls)
- New Edubiase United
2012–2014	AIK	50	(2)
2015	Kairat	0	(0)
2015–2016	Adana Demirspor	13	(0)
2016–2019	Silkeborg	56	(1)
2019	Hapoel Kfar Saba	0	(0)
2019	Erbil SC		
2020	ENPPI	0	(0)
2020–2021	Arambagh KS	7	(1)
2021–2022	HB Tórshavn	1	(0)
2021	→ Tvøroyrar Bóltfelag (loan)	13	(0)
2023	Cebu		
2023–	Rajasthan United	1	(0)

International career
- Ghana U20
- * Club domestic league appearances and goals as of 17:23, 29 October 2023 (UTC)

Ibrahim Moro (born 10 November 1993) is a Ghanaian professional footballer who plays as a midfielder for Rajasthan United.

== Club career ==
Moro played for Ghanaian side New Edubiase United, winning the MTN FA Cup in 2012, with Moro captaining the side and scoring the only goal in the final to help them to a 1–0 victory over Ashanti Gold to win the cup for the first time in the club's history and subsequently played in the CAF Confederation Cup with the side.

Moro moved from New Edubiase United to Swedish club AIK in August 2012.

On 23 December 2014, it was announced that Moro had requested a move and was acquired by FC Kairat of the Kazakhstan Premier League. Moro was ruled out for the 2015 season on 28 March 2015, and as a result was removed from Kairat's Premier League squad. On 1 September 2015 Moro cancelled his contract with FC Kairat, and signed a three-year contract with Adana Demirspor of the Turkish TFF First League.

Moro signed with Silkeborg IF in Denmark in August 2016. He left the club by mutual termination on 17 January 2019. Moro then trained with Hobro IK, where he also played a game for the clubs reserve team, but left again without a contract.

On 9 July 2019 Moro signed the Israeli Premier League club Hapoel Kfar Saba. A few days later it was reported, that he had been released. On 3 September 2019, Moro then signed with Iraqi-Kurdish club Erbil SC.

In the beginning of 2020, Moro moved to ENPPI. But due to the COVID-19 pandemic and the suspension of all sport-related activities in the country, Moro returned to Ghana in March 2020.

In December 2020, Moro signed with Bangladesh Premier League club Arambagh KS for one year.

On 18 May 2021, he signed for Faroe Islands Premier League club HB Tórshavn on a one-year deal.

On 12 July 2021, Moro joined Tvøroyrar Bóltfelag on loan for the remainder of the season.

He signed for Philippines Football League club Cebu for the 2023 season. He moved to Indian club Rajasthan United in October 2023.

== International career ==
Moro is a former Ghana youth international, and also appeared in the Summer Olympics. He also captained the Ghana under-20 national team. He was selected as part of Ghana's preliminary squad for the 2015 Africa Cup of Nations.

In 2016, Moro switched his alliance to Togo.

== Honours ==
New Edubiase United

- Ghanaian FA Cup: 2012
