= Nicklas Maripuu =

Swedish footballer

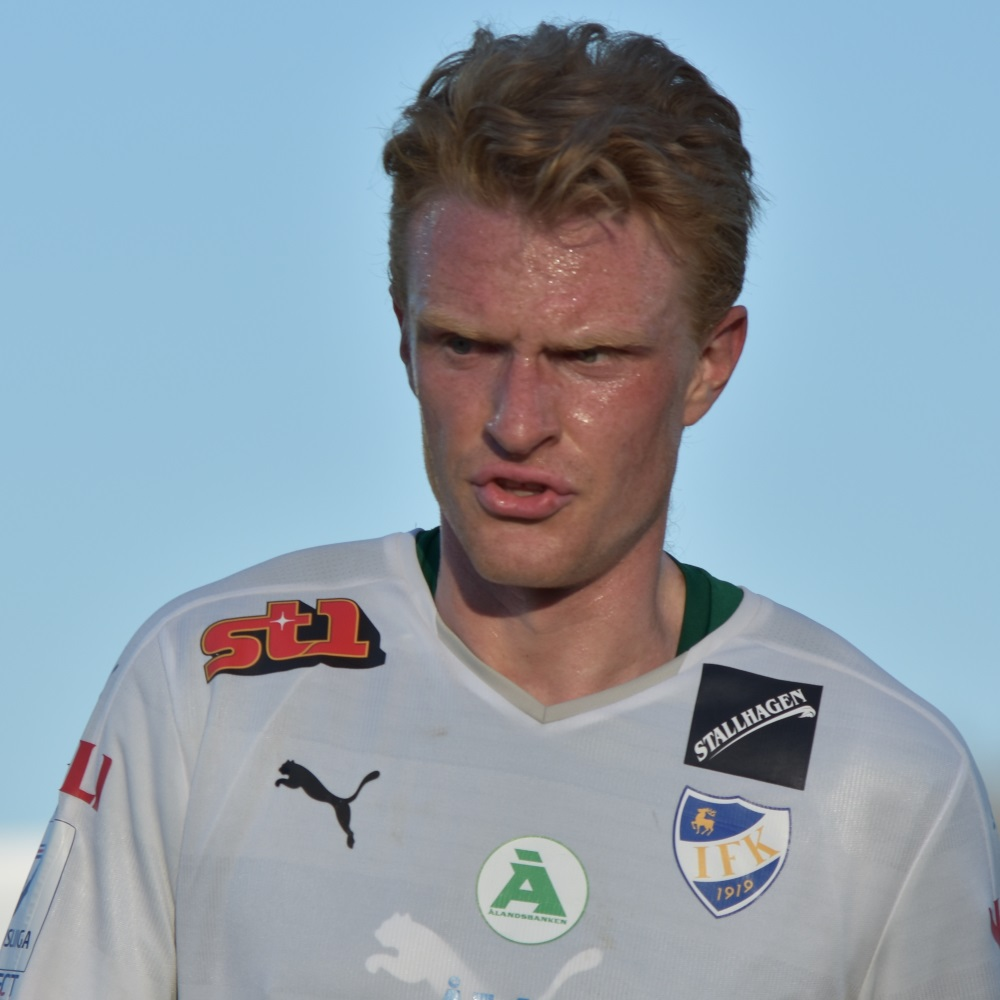

Personal information
- Date of birth: 2 March 1992 (age 34)
- Place of birth: Mölndal, Sweden
- Height: 1.86 m (6 ft 1 in)
- Position: Midfielder

Team information
- Current team: Vasalund IF
- Number: 6

Youth career
- 1997–2008: AIK

Senior career*
Years	Team	Apps	(Gls)
2009–2010	Väsby United	38	(0)
2010–2014	AIK	16	(0)
2010–2011	→ Väsby United (loan)	9	(0)
2012	→ Umeå FC (loan)	13	(0)
2013	→ GIF Sundsvall (loan)	28	(1)
2015–2016	IK Sirius	30	(2)
2016–2017	Jacksonville Armada	30	(0)
2018	IFK Mariehamn	22	(0)
2019–2020	Akropolis IF	56	(5)
2021	Degerfors IF	3	(0)
2022	Brommapojkarna	23	(0)
2023–	Vasalund IF	76	(2)

International career
2007–2008	Sweden U17	11	(2)
2009–2011	Sweden U19	10	(0)
- * Club domestic league appearances and goals as of 24 November 2025

Nicklas Maripuu (born 2 March 1992) is a Swedish footballer who plays for Vasalund IF as a midfielder.

== Career ==
In 2016 Maripuu signed with the NASL Jacksonville Armada.

Maripuu left IFK Mariehamn at the end of 2018.

On 22 December 2021, Maripuu signed with Brommapojkarna for the 2022 season.
