= Alhassan Kamara =

Sierra Leonean footballer

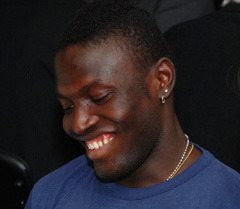

Personal information
- Full name: Alhassan Kamara
- Date of birth: 16 March 1993 (age 33)
- Place of birth: Freetown, Sierra Leone
- Height: 1.80 m (5 ft 11 in)
- Position: Striker

Youth career
- FC Kallon

Senior career*
Years	Team	Apps	(Gls)
2010–2011	FC Kallon		
2011	→ Boden (loan)	10	(5)
2012–2013	AIK	14	(0)
2012	→ Örebro (loan)	8	(4)
2013	→ Örebro (loan)	12	(6)
2014–2016	Örebro	29	(15)
2016–2018	Häcken	40	(12)
2018–2020	Panetolikos	11	(4)
2020	Halmstad	14	(2)
2021	IFK Värnamo	3	(1)

International career
2012–2018	Sierra Leone	16	(4)
- * Club domestic league appearances and goals

Alhassan A. Kamara (born 13 January 1993), commonly known as Crespo, is a retired Sierra Leonean footballer.

== Career ==
Kamara started his career with FC Kallon and joined Bodens BK, competing in Division 1 Norra, on 29 July 2011. He scored five goals in 10 games during his five months on loan at Boden. The striker signed a contract on 5 October 2011 with AIK.

During the first half of the 2012 season, he made 11 appearances for AIK. After the summer he was loaned out to Örebro SK, where he made four goal in eight appearances. On 24 January 2013 it was announced that he again was loaned to Örebro SK, for the rest of 2013. After the season Örebro SK decided to buy him from AIK, where he struggled to make an impact after failing to score in fourteen league appearances.

After getting injured early in the 2014 season, Kamara scored his first goal on 9 August against Mjällby AIF. He then proceeded to score, ending the season with 14 goals in the 12 last games despite often being substituted off in the second half (he played 90 minutes in 7 out of 19 games). He averaged one goal every 65 minutes in the last 12 games of the season, finishing with a hat trick in 7 minutes against BK Häcken.

On 2 June 2012 he made his senior international debut for Sierra Leone in a 2014 FIFA World Cup qualification game against Cape Verde.

On 2 September 2018, Greek Super League club Panetolikos officially announced the signing of Sierra Leonean international Alhassan Kamara Crespo until the end of 2019–20 season. The 25-year-old striker was recently released from Häcken, after two successful seasons at the Swedish Allsvenskan.

After a spell with IFK Värnamo, Kamara announced his retirement from football on 23 September 2021 after several years of problems with a knee injury.

== Career statistics ==
As of 4 December 2018

Club performance			League		Cup		Continental		Total	
Season	Club	League	Apps	Goals	Apps	Goals	Apps	Goals	Apps	Goals
Sweden			League		Svenska Cupen		Europe		Total	
2011	Bodens BK	Division 1	10	5	—		—		10	5
2012	AIK	Allsvenskan	11	0	—		1	0	12	0
2012	Örebro SK (loan)	Allsvenskan	8	4	—		—		8	4
2013	Örebro SK (loan)	Superettan	12	6	3	0	—		15	6
2013	AIK	Allsvenskan	3	0	—		—		3	0
2014	Örebro SK	Allsvenskan	19	14	5	2	—		24	16
2015	Örebro SK	Allsvenskan	0	0	1	2	—		1	2
2016	Örebro SK	Allsvenskan	10	1	3	1	—		13	2
2016	BK Häcken	Allsvenskan	14	5	6	5	—		20	10
2017	BK Häcken	Allsvenskan	12	5	4	1	—		16	6
2018	BK Häcken	Allsvenskan	14	2	1	1	4	0	19	3
2018–19	Panetolikos	Super League Greece	9	4	1	0	—		10	4
Career total			122	46	24	12	5	0	151	58
