= William Leandersson =

Swedish footballer

Personal information
- Full name: William Leandersson
- Date of birth: 9 January 1984 (age 42)
- Place of birth: Sweden
- Height: 1.82 m (5 ft 11 1/2 in)
- Position: Defender

Youth career
- –2000: Mjällby AIF

Senior career*
Years	Team	Apps	(Gls)
2000–2001	Mjällby AIF	1	(0)
2002–2003	IF Elfsborg	0	(0)
2003–2013	Mjällby AIF	176	(1)
2014–2015	Hörvikens IF	20	(4)
2015–2016	Mjällby AIF	33	(0)

International career
1999–2000	Sweden U16	13	(1)
2001	Sweden U17	2	(0)
2001	Sweden U18	6	(0)
2002–2003	Sweden U19	13	(0)
- * Club domestic league appearances and goals as of 10 April 2017 (UTC)

William Leandersson (born 9 January 1984) is a Swedish footballer who plays as a defender.
