= Robert Åhman Persson =

Swedish footballer (born 1987)

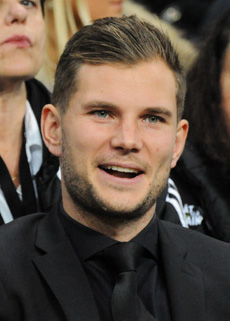
- Persson in 2013

Personal information
- Full name: Robert Hans Folke Åhman Persson
- Date of birth: 26 March 1987 (age 39)
- Place of birth: Uppsala, Sweden
- Height: 1.88 m (6 ft 2 in)
- Positions: Centre-back; defensive midfielder

Youth career
- 1991–2003: Bälinge

Senior career*
Years	Team	Apps	(Gls)
2004–2007	AIK	15	(2)
2006	→ Väsby United (loan)	25	(1)
2007–2008	Viborg	27	(0)
2008–2010	Malmö FF	53	(4)
2010–2013	AIK	61	(7)
2014–2016	Örebro SK	74	(5)
2017–2018	Belenenses	26	(0)
2018–2020	IK Sirius	18	(1)
Total		299	(20)

International career
2006	Sweden U19	4	(0)
2006–2008	Sweden U21	12	(1)
- * Club domestic league appearances and goals

Robert Hans Folke Åhman Persson (born 26 March 1987) is a Swedish former professional footballer who played as a defensive midfielder.

== Career ==
Born in Uppsala, Robert Åhman Persson, a centre back, left back and central midfielder, was with Bälinge from childhood in 1991 until the age of 16 in 2003. He spent three years (2004–07) with AIK (including a 2006 loan to Väsby United), then moved to Viborg for a year and, subsequently, to Malmö FF from 2008 to 2010. He was a part of the team that won the championship, although he only belonged to the team for the half season. In the summer of 2010 he returned to AIK.

In the autumn 2013 it was official that AIK would not offer him a new contract. Later he was attached by newly promoted Örebro SK on a free transfer.

He moved to Belenenses in January 2017, but returned to his native country in June 2018 after playing 24 games in the Primeira Liga, signing a long term-deal with IK Sirius from his birth city Uppsala.

He announced his retirement from professional football on 20 May 2020, following a knee injury.

== Career statistics ==
Appearances and goals by club, season and competition
Club	Season	League			Cup		Europe		Other		Total	
Club	Season	Division	Apps	Goals	Apps	Goals	Apps	Goals	Apps	Goals	Apps	Goals
AIK	2004	Allsvenskan	1	0	0	0	0	0	0	0	1	0
AIK	2005	Superettan	6	2	0	0	0	0	0	0	6	2
AIK	2007	Allsvenskan	8	0	0	0	0	0	0	0	8	0
AIK	Total		15	2	0	0	0	0	0	0	15	2
Väsby United (loan)	2006	Superettan	25	1	0	0	0	0	0	0	25	1
Viborg	2007–08	Superliga	27	0	0	0	0	0	0	0	27	0
Malmö FF	2008	Allsvenskan	18	1	0	0	0	0	0	0	18	1
Malmö FF	2009	Allsvenskan	26	0	1	0	0	0	0	0	27	0
Malmö FF	2010	Allsvenskan	9	3	0	0	0	0	0	0	9	3
Malmö FF	Total		53	4	1	0	0	0	0	0	54	4
AIK	2010	Allsvenskan	13	0	1	0	4	0	0	0	18	0
AIK	2011	Allsvenskan	24	5	1	0	0	0	0	0	25	5
AIK	2012	Allsvenskan	16	1	1	0	5	0	1	0	23	1
AIK	2013	Allsvenskan	8	1	3	0	0	0	0	0	11	1
AIK	Total		61	7	6	0	9	0	1	0	77	7
Örebro	2014	Allsvenskan	19	1	0	0	0	0	0	0	19	1
Örebro	2015	Allsvenskan	28	1	5	0	0	0	0	0	33	1
Örebro	2016	Allsvenskan	27	3	4	0	0	0	0	0	31	3
Örebro	Total		74	5	9	0	0	0	0	0	83	5
Belenenses	2016–17	Primeira Liga	12	0	0	0	0	0	0	0	12	0
Belenenses	2017–18	Primeira Liga	14	0	2	0	0	0	0	0	16	0
Belenenses	Total		26	0	2	0	0	0	0	0	28	0
IK Sirius	2018	Allsvenskan	15	1	0	0	0	0	0	0	15	1
IK Sirius	2019	Allsvenskan	3	0	0	0	0	0	0	0	3	0
IK Sirius	2020	Allsvenskan	0	0	0	0	0	0	0	0	0	0
IK Sirius	Total		18	1	0	0	0	0	0	0	18	1
Career total			299	20	18	0	9	0	1	0	327	20

== Honours ==
Malmö FF

- Allsvenskan: 2010
