= 2017 AIK Fotboll season =

AIK
2017 season
- Chairman: Per Bystedt
- Manager: Rikard Norling
- Stadium: Skytteholms IP; Friends Arena; Tele2 Arena
- Allsvenskan: 2nd
- 2016–17 Svenska Cupen: Quarterfinal vs BK Häcken
- 2017–18 Svenska Cupen: Progress to 2018 season
- UEFA Europa League: Third Qualifying Round vs Braga
- Top goalscorer: League: Nicolás Stefanelli (9); All: Nicolás Stefanelli (10)
- Highest home attendance: 33,157 vs Djurgården (27 August 2017)
- Lowest home attendance: 3,495 vs GAIS (19 February 2017)
- Average home league attendance: 17,807 (Allsvenskan - 5 November 2017); 15,099 (All competitions - 5 November 2017)
Home colours	Away colours	Third colours

The 2017 season was AIK's 126th in existence, their 89th season in Allsvenskan and their 12th consecutive season in the league. The team competed in Allsvenskan, Svenska Cupen and UEFA Europa League.

== Season events ==
=== Winter ===
Prior to the start of the season, AIK announced the signing of Jesper Nyholm from Dalkurd on a contract until the end of 2019, and the departure of Niclas Eliasson to IFK Norrköping after they exercised an option in the loan agreement to make the move permanent.

On 1 January, Ahmed Yasin joined Muaither on loan until 31 May.

On 23 January, AIK announced that Alexander Isak had been sold to Borussia Dortmund.

On 25 January, AIK and Jos Hooiveld mutual agreed to end their contract early, with Hooiveld going on to sign for Twente.

On 31 January, AIK announced the signing of Kristoffer Olsson from Midtjylland until the end of 2020, and the departure of Ebenezer Ofori to VfB Stuttgart.

On 4 February, AIK announced the loan signing of Simon Thern from Heerenveen for the season.

On 8 February, AIK announced the loan signing of Stipe Vrdoljak from NK Novigrad until 31 July, with an option to make the transfer permanent.

On 3 March, AIK announced the signing of Sulejman Krpić from Sloboda Tuzla until the end of 2019, and the return of Henok Goitom on a contract until the end of 2018.

On 28 March, Patrick Kpozo joined Tromsø on loan until 20 July, with an option to extend the loan until the end of the season.

=== Summer ===
On 30 June, AIK announced that Stipe Vrdoljak's loan had been ended and that they had not taken up the option of making the move permanent, and that they had signed Nicolás Stefanelli from Defensa y Justicia on a contract until 31 December 2020.

On 3 July, AIK announced the signing of Rasmus Lindkvist from Vålerenga on a contract until 31 December 2020. The following day, 4 July, AIK announced the singing of Robert Taylor from RoPS also on a contract until 31 December 2020.

On 7 July, AIK announced that Sulejman Krpić had left the club to return to Sloboda Tuzla.

On 20 July, Sauli Väisänen left AIK to sign for SPAL.

On 26 July, AIK announced the loan signing of Agustin Gómez from Defensa y Justicia for the remainder of the season, and the return of Chinedu Obasi on a contract until the end of the season.

On 4 August, Patrick Kpozo left AIK to join Östersund.

== Squad ==
As of match played 5 November 2017

No.	Name	Nationality	Position	Date of birth (age)	Signed from	Signed in	Contract ends	Apps.	Goals
Goalkeepers
13	Kyriakos Stamatopoulos	(Canada)	GK	28 August 1979 (aged 38)	Tromsø	2011		63	0
34	Oscar Linnér	(Sweden)	GK	23 February 1997 (aged 20)	Academy	2015		46	0
35	Gustav Nyberg	(Sweden)	GK	1 May 1998 (aged 19)	Academy	2017		0	0
Defenders
2	Haukur Hauksson	(Iceland)	DF	1 September 1991 (aged 26)	KR	2015	2019	72	7
3	Per Karlsson	(Sweden)	DF	2 January 1986 (aged 31)	Academy	2003			
4	Nils-Eric Johansson	(Sweden)	DF	13 January 1980 (aged 37)	Leicester City	2007		370	21
5	Jesper Nyholm	(Sweden)	DF	10 September 1993 (aged 24)	Dalkurd	2017	2019	30	1
9	Rasmus Lindkvist	(Sweden)	DF	16 May 1990 (aged 27)	Vålerenga	2017	2020	19	4
15	Agustin Gómez	(Argentina)	DF	28 August 1996 (aged 21)	on loan from Defensa y Justicia	2017	2017	1	0
21	Daniel Sundgren	(Sweden)	DF	22 November 1990 (aged 26)	Degerfors	2016	2019	70	5
Midfielders
6	Simon Thern	(Sweden)	MF	18 September 1992 (aged 25)	on loan from Heerenveen	2017	2017	31	1
7	Kristoffer Olsson	(Sweden)	MF	30 June 1995 (aged 22)	Midtjylland	2017	2020	39	3
8	Johan Blomberg	(Sweden)	MF	14 June 1987 (aged 30)	Halmstad	2015	2017	108	12
14	Robert Taylor	(Finland)	MF	21 October 1994 (aged 23)	RoPS	2017	2020	5	0
24	Stefan Ishizaki	(Sweden)	MF	15 May 1982 (aged 35)	Unattached	2015	2017		
25	William Jan	(Sweden)	MF	7 October 1998 (aged 19)	Academy	2016		0	0
37	Gabriel Aphrem	(Sweden)	MF	19 July 1999 (aged 18)	Academy	2017		0	0
39	Amin Affane	(Sweden)	MF	21 January 1994 (aged 23)	Arminia Bielefeld	2016		49	3
40	Bilal Hussein	(Sweden)	MF	22 April 2000 (aged 17)	Academy	2017		0	0
43	Albin Linnér	(Sweden)	MF	14 February 1999 (aged 18)	Academy	2017		0	0
Forwards
10	Denni Avdić	(Sweden)	FW	5 September 1988 (aged 29)	AZ Alkmaar	2016	2018	52	8
17	Daniel Mushitu	(Sweden)	FW	22 February 2000 (aged 17)	Västerås	2017		5	0
20	Chinedu Obasi	(Nigeria)	FW	1 June 1986 (aged 31)	Shenzhen	2017	2017	20	12
22	Nicolás Stefanelli	(Argentina)	FW	22 November 1994 (aged 22)	Defensa y Justicia	2017	2020	19	10
36	Henok Goitom	(Eritrea)	FW	22 September 1984 (aged 33)	San Jose Earthquakes	2017	2018	145	58
38	Nebiyou Perry	(Sweden)	FW	2 October 1999 (aged 18)	Academy	2017		1	0
Out on loan
11	Eero Markkanen	(Finland)	FW	3 July 1991 (aged 26)	RoPS	2016	2018	66	22
16	Rickson Mansiamina	(Sweden)	MF	9 July 1997 (aged 20)	Academy	2016		1	0
18	Noah Sundberg	(Sweden)	DF	6 June 1996 (aged 21)	Academy	2013		40	3
19	Ahmed Yasin	(Iraq)	MF	22 April 1991 (aged 26)	AGF	2016	2018	27	2
29	Anton Salétros	(Sweden)	MF	12 April 1996 (aged 21)	Academy	2013		90	2
31	Christos Gravius	(Sweden)	MF	14 October 1997 (aged 20)	Academy	2015		17	0
Left during the season
9	Sulejman Krpić	(Bosnia and Herzegovina)	FW	1 January 1991 (aged 26)	Sloboda Tuzla	2017	2019	6	0
14	Stipe Vrdoljak	(Croatia)	DF	2 August 1993 (aged 24)	on loan from Novigrad	2017	2017	10	0
15	Sauli Väisänen	(Finland)	DF	5 June 1994 (aged 23)	Honka	2014		64	4
17	Ebenezer Ofori	(Ghana)	MF	1 July 1995 (aged 22)	New Edubiase United	2013	2017	101	5
26	Jos Hooiveld	(Netherlands)	DF	22 April 1983 (aged 34)	Unattached	2015	2017	60	2
32	Patrick Kpozo	(Ghana)	DF	15 July 1997 (aged 20)	International Allies	2015		18	0
36	Alexander Isak	(Sweden)	FW	21 September 1999 (aged 18)	Academy	2016		29	13

== Transfers ==
=== In ===
Date	Position	Nationality	Name	From	Fee	Ref.
1 January 2017	DF	(Sweden)	Jesper Nyholm	Dalkurd	Undisclosed	
31 January 2017	MF	(Sweden)	Kristoffer Olsson	Midtjylland	Undisclosed	
3 March 2017	FW	(Bosnia and Herzegovina)	Sulejman Krpić	Sloboda Tuzla	Undisclosed	
3 March 2017	FW	(Eritrea)	Henok Goitom	Unattached	Free	
30 June 2017	FW	(Argentina)	Nicolás Stefanelli	Defensa y Justicia	Undisclosed	
3 July 2017	DF	(Sweden)	Rasmus Lindkvist	Vålerenga	Undisclosed	
4 July 2017	MF	(Finland)	Robert Taylor	RoPS	Undisclosed	
26 July 2017	FW	(Nigeria)	Chinedu Obasi	Shenzhen	Undisclosed	

=== Loans in ===
Start date	Position	Nationality	Name	From	End date	Ref.
4 February 2017	MF	(Sweden)	Simon Thern	Heerenveen	31 December 2017	
8 February 2017	DF	(Croatia)	Stipe Vrdoljak	NK Novigrad	30 June 2017	
26 July 2017	DF	(Argentina)	Agustin Gómez	Defensa y Justicia	31 December 2017	

=== Out ===
Date	Position	Nationality	Name	To	Fee	Ref.
1 January 2017	MF	(Sweden)	Niclas Eliasson	IFK Norrköping	Undisclosed	
23 January 2017	FW	(Sweden)	Alexander Isak	Borussia Dortmund	Undisclosed	
31 January 2017	DF	(Ghana)	Ebenezer Ofori	VfB Stuttgart	Undisclosed	
6 July 2017	FW	(Bosnia and Herzegovina)	Sulejman Krpić	Sloboda Tuzla	Undisclosed	
20 July 2017	DF	(Finland)	Sauli Väisänen	SPAL	Undisclosed	
4 August 2017	DF	(Ghana)	Patrick Kpozo	Östersund	Undisclosed	

=== Loans out ===
Start date	Position	Nationality	Name	To	End date	Ref.
1 January 2017	MF	(Iraq)	Ahmed Yasin	Muaither	24 April 2017	
21 March 2017	MF	(Sweden)	Christos Gravius	Jönköpings Södra	31 December 2017	
28 March 2017	DF	(Ghana)	Patrick Kpozo	Tromsø	20 July 2017	
28 March 2017	DF	(Sweden)	Noah Sundberg	GIF Sundsvall	31 December 2017	
31 March 2017	MF	(Sweden)	Rickson Mansiamina	GAIS	15 July 2017	
13 July 2017	MF	(Iraq)	Ahmed Yasin	BK Häcken	31 December 2017	
25 July 2017	MF	(Sweden)	Rickson Mansiamina	Syrianska	31 December 2015	
4 August 2017	FW	(Finland)	Eero Markkanen	Dynamo Dresden	30 June 2018	
11 August 2017	MF	(Sweden)	Anton Salétros	Újpest	31 December 2017	

=== Released ===
Date	Position	Nationality	Name	Joined	Date	Ref
25 January 2017	DF	(Netherlands)	Jos Hooiveld	Twente	25 January 2017	
31 December 2017	DF	(Sweden)	Stefan Ishizaki	IF Elfsborg	1 January 2018	
31 December 2017	MF	(Sweden)	Johan Blomberg	Colorado Rapids	1 January 2018	
31 December 2017	FW	(Nigeria)	Chinedu Obasi	Bolton Wanderers	3 March 2018	

== Friendlies ==
21 January 2017	Vasalunds IF	0–4	AIK	Stockholm
12:00 CET (UTC+1)	Id Salem (yellow card) 10'; Amoah (yellow card) 28'; Skenderovic (yellow card) 88'	Report	Ishizaki 2'; Sundgren 28' (pen.); A.Linnér 48'; Affane 62'	Stadium: Skytteholms IP; Attendance: 1,050; Referee: Victor Wolf

28 January 2017	Syrianska	0–4	AIK	Södertälje
13:00 CET (UTC+1)		Report	Blomberg 39'; Mansiamina 44', 78'; Kpozo 87'	Stadium: Södertälje Fotbollsarena; Attendance: 400; Referee: Johan Krantz

28 January 2017	AIK	0–1	Sollentuna	Södertälje
16:00 CET (UTC+1)	Sundberg (red card) 81'	Report	Pishdari 76'; Aljaderi (yellow card) 89'	Stadium: Södertälje Fotbollsarena; Attendance: 97; Referee: Björn Särnbrink

6 February 2017 Dubai International Cup	Midtjylland	1–1 (4–3 p)	AIK	Dubai, United Arab Emirates
15:00 CET (UTC+1)	Novák 20'	Report	Markkanen 37' (yellow card) 54'	Stadium: Jebel Ali Centre of Excellence; Attendance: 75; Referee: Ahmad Eisa
	Penalties
	Duelund (penalty scored); Riis (penalty scored); Hansen (penalty scored); Poulsen (penalty scored); Bruninho (penalty missed)		(penalty scored) Mansiamina; (penalty scored) Markkanen; (penalty missed) Blomberg; (penalty scored) Thern; (penalty missed) Sundgren

11 February 2017 Dubai International Cup	IFK Göteborg	2–1	AIK	Dubai, United Arab Emirates
15:00 CET (UTC+1)	Nyholm 2' (o.g.); Hysén 86'	Report	Affane 12'	Stadium: Jebel Ali Centre of Excellence; Attendance: 109; Referee: Adel Al Nagabi

22 February 2017	AIK	1–2	Karlberg	Stockholm
18:00 CET (UTC+1)	A.Linnér 77'	Report	Nader 44' (yellow card) 81'; Keshavarz 60'	Stadium: Skytteholms IP; Attendance: 200; Referee: Ozan Camlibel

17 March 2017	AIK	1–0	IK Sirius	Stockholm
17:00 CET (UTC+1)	Krpić 76'; Olsson (yellow card) 81'; Johansson (yellow card) 89'	Report	Arvidsson 64'	Stadium: Skytteholms IP; Attendance: 625; Referee: Johan Hamlin

26 March 2017	AIK	2–0	IFK Norrköping	Stockholm
14:00 CET (UTC+1)	Goitom 12'; Johansson 88'	Report		Stadium: Friends Arena; Attendance: 2,511; Referee: Stefan Johannesson

22 June 2017	Flora Tallinn	2–0	AIK	Tallinn, Estonia
15:00 CEST (UTC+2)	Alliku 69'; Sappinen 72'	Report		Stadium: A. Le Coq Arena; Attendance: 341; Referee: Romer Tarajev

17 November 2017	AIK	0–0	IK Brage	Stockholm
15:00 CET (UTC+1)		Report	Hjertstrand (yellow card) 81'	Stadium: Skytteholms IP; Attendance: 611; Referee: Kastriot Gerxhaliu

24 November 2017	AIK	3–1	Sollentuna	Stockholm
15:00 CET (UTC+1)	Goitom 20'; Olsson 57'; Stefanelli 64'	Report	Gómez 16' (o.g.); Sabetkar (yellow card) 41'; Ågren (yellow card) 43'	Stadium: Skytteholms IP; Attendance: 419; Referee: Ozan Camlibel

== Competitions ==
=== Overview ===
Competition	First match	Last match	Starting round	Final position	Record							
Competition	First match	Last match	Starting round	Final position	Pld	W	D	L	GF	GA	GD	Win %
Allsvenskan	2 April 2017	5 November 2017	Matchday 1	2nd	30	16	9	5	47	22	+25	53.33
2016–17 Svenska Cupen	19 February 2017	12 March 2017	From 2016 season	Quarterfinal	4	2	1	1	4	3	+1	50.00
2017–18 Svenska Cupen	23 August 2017	Progress to 2018 season	Second round	Progress to 2018 season	1	1	0	0	1	0	+1	100.00
UEFA Europa League	29 June 2017	3 August 2017	First qualifying round	Third qualifying round	6	2	3	1	9	3	+6	33.33
Total					41	21	13	7	61	28	+33	51.22

Last updated: 5 November 2017
Source: Competitions

=== Allsvenskan ===
==== League table ====
Pos	Team	Pld	W	D	L	GF	GA	GD	Pts	Qualification or relegation
1	Malmö FF (C)	30	19	7	4	63	27	+36	64	Qualification for the Champions League first qualifying round
2	AIK	30	16	9	5	47	22	+25	57	Qualification for the Europa League first qualifying round
3	Djurgårdens IF	30	15	8	7	54	30	+24	53	Qualification for the Europa League second qualifying round (Note: Since the winners of 2017–18 Svenska Cupen (Djurgårdens IF) qualified for European competitions based on their league position, the berth awarded to the 3rd-placed team (Europa League second qualifying round) was passed down to the 4th-placed team (BK Häcken).)
4	BK Häcken	30	14	10	6	42	28	+14	52	Qualification for the Europa League first qualifying round
5	Östersunds FK	30	13	11	6	48	32	+16	50	

Source: svenskfotboll.se (in Swedish)
Rules for classification: 1) Points; 2) Goal difference; 3) Goals scored; 4) Head-to-head points; 5) Head-to-head goal difference; 6) Head-to-head away goals scored; 7) Play-off
(Note: Play-off is only played if need to decide champion, teams for relegation or UEFA competition and will be played on a neutral ground).
(C) Champions

==== Results summary ====
Overall								Home						Away					
Pld	W	D	L	GF	GA	GD	Pts	W	D	L	GF	GA	GD	W	D	L	GF	GA	GD
30	16	9	5	47	22	+25	57	7	5	3	21	12	+9	9	4	2	26	10	+16

Last updated: 5 November 2017.
Source: (in Swedish)

==== Results by round ====
Round	1	2	3	4	5	6	7	8	9	10	11	12	13	14	15	16	17	18	19	20	21	22	23	24	25	26	27	28	29	30
Ground	H	A	H	A	H	H	A	H	A	H	A	A	H	A	H	H	A	A	H	A	H	A	H	A	A	H	H	A	H	A
Result	D	W	L	L	W	D	W	W	W	L	D	W	D	W	W	L	W	L	D	W	D	D	W	D	W	W	W	D	W	W
Position	9	5	9	12	8	9	6	5	6	4	7	4	6	5	2	2	4	2	4	3	3	4	4	4	3	3	2	2	2	2

Updated to match(es) played on 5 November 2017. Source: see Results
A = Away; H = Home; W = Win; D = Draw; L = Loss

==== Results ====
2 April 2017 1	AIK	0–0	BK Häcken	Stockholm
15:00 CEST (UTC+2)	Vrdoljak (yellow card) 47'	Report	Mohammed (yellow card) 9' (yellow-red card) 88'	Stadium: Friends Arena; Attendance: 26,812; Referee: Andreas Ekberg

10 April 2017 2	Elfsborg	1–2	AIK	Borås
19:00 CEST (UTC+2)	Dyer (yellow card) 6'; Frick 36'; Jönsson (yellow card) 45'; Prodell (yellow card) 86'	Report	Goitom 26'; Nyholm 26'; Markkanen (yellow card) 90+4'	Stadium: Borås Arena; Attendance: 9,335; Referee: Johan Hamlin

17 April 2017 3	AIK	1–2	Hammarby	Stockholm
15:00 CEST (UTC+2)	Johansson 14'; Krpić (yellow card) 16'; Olsson (yellow card) 28'	Report	Smárason 18'; Sævarsson (yellow card) 38'; Aidoo (yellow card) 40'; Dibba 79'; Hamad (yellow card) 89'	Stadium: Friends Arena; Attendance: 32,318; Referee: Jonas Eriksson

22 April 2017 4	Jönköpings Södra	2–1	AIK	Jönköping
16:00 CET (UTC+1)	S.Karlsson 5'; Calisir (yellow card) 64'; Svensson 68'; Kozica (yellow card) 77'	Report	Blomberg 1'; Nyholm (yellow card) 15'; Olsson (yellow card) 55'; Ishizaki (yellow card) 65'; Thern (yellow card) 84'	Stadium: Stadsparksvallen; Attendance: 5,191; Referee: Andreas Ekberg

27 April 2017 5	AIK	1–0	IK Sirius	Stockholm
19:00 CEST (UTC+2)	Markkanen 31'; Johansson (yellow card) 62'; Linnér (yellow card) 90+2'	Report	Arvidsson (yellow card) 85'	Stadium: Friends Arena; Attendance: 13,517; Referee: Mohammed Al-Hakim

30 April 2017 6	AIK	0–0	GIF Sundsvall	Stockholm
15:00 CEST (UTC+2)	Sundgren (yellow card) 86'	Report	Danielson (yellow card) 52'; Larsson (yellow card) 55'; Sigurðsson (yellow card) 78'; Suljević (yellow card) 78'	Stadium: Friends Arena; Attendance: 11,927; Referee: Johan Hamlin

6 May 2017 7	Halmstad	0–1	AIK	Halmstad
16:00 CEST (UTC+2)	Pękalski (yellow card) 31'; Johansson (yellow card) 33'	Report	Blomberg 5'; Olsson (yellow card) 14'; Thern (yellow card) 35'; Johansson (yellow card) 76' (yellow-red card) 90+3'; Linnér (yellow card) 90+3'	Stadium: Örjans Vall; Attendance: 5,438; Referee: Kristoffer Karlsson

13 May 2017 8	AIK	1–0	Örebro	Stockholm
16:00 CEST (UTC+2)	Ishizaki 18'; Markkanen (yellow card) 20'; Linnér (yellow card) 78'; Salétros (yellow card) 78'; Sundgren (yellow card) 82'; Vrdoljak (yellow card) 87'	Report	Hines Ike (yellow card) 20'; Rogić (yellow card) 53'	Stadium: Friends Arena; Attendance: 13,236; Referee: Kaspar Sjöberg

22 May 2017 10	Djurgården	0–1	AIK	Stockholm
19:00 CEST (UTC+2)		Report	Thern 20'; Vrdoljak (yellow card) 70'	Stadium: Tele2 Arena; Attendance: 25,754; Referee: Mohammed Al-Hakim

29 May 2017 11	AIK	0–1	Malmö	Stockholm
19:00 CEST (UTC+2)	Markkanen (yellow card) 52'	Report	Rakip (yellow card) 27'; Carvalho 90+3'	Stadium: Friends Arena; Attendance: 19,570; Referee: Glenn Nyberg

1 June 2017 16	IFK Norrköping	0–0	AIK	Norrköping
19:00 CEST (UTC+2)		Report	Karlsson (yellow card) 13'; Blomberg (yellow card) 19'; Olsson (yellow card) 64'	Stadium: Nya Parken; Attendance: 12,303; Referee: Stefan Johannesson

4 June 2017 12	AFC Eskilstuna	1–3	AIK	Eskilstuna
15:00 CEST (UTC+2)	Eddahri 37'; Buya Turay (yellow card) 61'; Piermayr (yellow card) 90+3'	Report	Sundgren 20'; Avdić 85'; Markkanen 89'	Stadium: Tunavallen; Attendance: 7,047; Referee: Johan Hamlin

2 July 2017 13	AIK	2–2	Östersund	Stockholm
17:30 CEST (UTC+2)	Affane (yellow card) 31'; Goitom 33'; Väisänen (yellow card) 70'; Avdić 87'	Report	Ghoddos (yellow card) 9'; Somi 22', 57'; Nouri (yellow card) 43'; Bachirou (yellow card) 73'; Sema (yellow card) 85'	Stadium: Friends Arena; Attendance: 15,121; Referee: Stefan Johannesson

9 July 2017 14	Kalmar	0–1	AIK	Kalmar
17:30 CEST (UTC+2)	Eid (yellow card) 17'; Sachpekidis (yellow card) 65'	Report	Karlsson (yellow card) 16'; Goitom 67'	Stadium: Guldfågeln Arena; Attendance: 10,318; Referee: Magnus Lindgren

16 July 2017 15	AIK	1–0	IFK Norrköping	Stockholm
17:30 CEST (UTC+2)	Affane (yellow card) 23'; Telo 75' (o.g.); Goitom (yellow card) 90+4'	Report	Wahlqvist (yellow card) 48'	Stadium: Friends Arena; Attendance: 16,273; Referee: Jonas Eriksson

30 July 2017 17	AIK	0–1	Kalmar	Stockholm
17:30 CEST (UTC+2)		Report	Ring (yellow card) 28'; Nouri (yellow card) 29'; H.Hallberg 73'	Stadium: Friends Arena; Attendance: 14,337; Referee: Mohammed Al-Hakim

6 August 2017 18	IK Sirius	1–4	AIK	Uppsala
17:30 CEST (UTC+2)	Haglund (yellow card) 48'; Arvidsson 83'	Report	Obasi 7' (pen.), 37'; Stefanelli 16'; Goitom 65'	Stadium: Studenternas IP; Attendance: 6,748; Referee: Stefan Johannesson

10 August 2017 9	IFK Göteborg	2–1	AIK	Gothenburg
19:00 CEST (UTC+2)	Rieks 55'; Eriksson (yellow card) 58'; Boman 65'; Adekugbe (yellow card) 70'; Rogne (yellow card) 78'	Report	Affane 4'; Sundgren (yellow card) 39'; Stefanelli (yellow card) 52'	Stadium: Gamla Ullevi; Attendance: 16,187; Referee: Mohammed Al-Hakim
Note: Match was originally scheduled to be played during the week of 16-18 May, but was postponed due to Match fixing allegations.

13 August 2017 19	AIK	1–1	AFC Eskilstuna	Stockholm
15:00 CEST (UTC+2)	Karlsson (yellow card) 41'; Stefanelli (yellow card) 48'; Olsson 54'; Obasi (yellow card) 56'; Hauksson (yellow card) 75'	Report	Buya Turay 18'; Tsiskaridze (yellow card) 38'; Alexandersson (yellow card) 45'; Öhman (yellow card) 53'; Michel (yellow card) 62'; Noor (yellow card) 90+5'	Stadium: Friends Arena; Attendance: 12,087; Referee: Jonas Eriksson

20 August 2017 20	Östersund	0–3	AIK	Östersund
15:00 CEST (UTC+2)	Mensiro (yellow card) 31'; Bertilsson (yellow card) 41'; Edwards (yellow card) 23' (yellow-red card) 51'	Report	Sundgren 12'; Stefanelli 67'; Affane (yellow card) 80'; Avdić 87'	Stadium: Jämtkraft Arena; Attendance: 5,779; Referee: Bojan Pandžić

27 August 2017 21	AIK	1–1	Djurgården	Stockholm
15:00 CEST (UTC+2)	Ishizaki (yellow card) 11'; Karlsson (yellow card) 23'; Obasi 39' (pen.); Hauksson (yellow card) 58'; Linnér (yellow card) 80'	Report	Eriksson (yellow card) 55'; Olsson (yellow card) 65'; Walker (yellow card) 71'; Badji 84'	Stadium: Friends Arena; Attendance: 33,157; Referee: Stefan Johannesson

10 September 2017 22	Hammarby	1–1	AIK	Stockholm
15:00 CEST (UTC+2)	Dibba 12' (yellow card) 77'	Report	Olsson 45+3'; Johansson (yellow card) 54'	Stadium: Tele2 Arena; Attendance: 29,306; Referee: Jonas Eriksson

17 September 2017 23	AIK	4–1	Halmstad	Stockholm
15:00 CEST (UTC+2)	Stefanelli 21', 37'; Lindkvist 34'; Goitom 42'; Johansson (yellow card) 50'	Report	M.Johansson (yellow card) 56'; N.Johansson 71' (o.g.)	Stadium: Friends Arena; Attendance: 10,342; Referee: Magnus Lindgren

20 September 2017 24	GIF Sundsvall	0–0	AIK	Sundsvall
19:00 CEST (UTC+2)		Report	Olsson (yellow card) 38'	Stadium: Norrporten Arena; Attendance: 4,052; Referee: Patrik Eriksson

24 September 2017 25	BK Häcken	1–6	AIK	Gothenburg
17:30 CEST (UTC+2)	Mohammed 39'; Paulinho (yellow card) 42'	Report	Karlsson 24'; Sundgren 27', 73'; Stefanelli 35'; Lindkvist 37', 77'; Ishizaki (yellow card) 39'	Stadium: Bravida Arena; Attendance: 3,578; Referee: Stefan Johannesson

1 October 2017 26	AIK	5–2	Elfsborg	Stockholm
17:30 CEST (UTC+2)	Blomberg 14'; Stefanelli 31', 55', 64'; Hauksson 45+2'	Report	Jönsson (yellow card) 27'; Frick 34'; Gustavsson 48'; Dyer (yellow card) 53'	Stadium: Friends Arena; Attendance: 12,282; Referee: Kaspar Sjöberg

15 October 2017 27	AIK	2–0	Jönköpings Södra	Stockholm
15:00 CEST (UTC+2)	Jallow 49' (o.g.); Blomberg (yellow card) 81'; Johansson 85'	Report	Smylie (yellow card) 57'; Siwe 87'	Stadium: Friends Arena; Attendance: 16,257; Referee: Andreas Ekberg

23 October 2017 28	Malmö	0–0	AIK	Malmö
19:00 CEST (UTC+2)	Christiansen (yellow card) 55'; Rosenberg (yellow card) 60'	Report	Johansson (yellow card) 8'; Hauksson (yellow card) 30'; Sundgren (yellow card) 44'	Stadium: Swedbank Stadion; Attendance: 19,535; Referee: Stefan Johannesson

29 October 2017 29	AIK	2–1	IFK Göteborg	Stockholm
19:00 CEST (UTC+2)	Obasi 8'; Lindkvist 45+1'; Blomberg (yellow card) 86'	Report	Eriksson (yellow card) 27'; Adekugbe (yellow card) 33'; Sakor (yellow card) 62' (goal) 72'; Ohlsson (yellow card) 79'	Stadium: Friends Arena; Attendance: 19,870; Referee: Kristoffer Karlsson

5 November 2017 30	Örebro	1–2	AIK	Örebro
15:00 5 November 2017	Igboananike 67' (yellow card) 75'; Gerzić (yellow card) 74'; Brorsson (yellow card) 90+2'	Report	Obasi 30' (yellow card) 74'; Stefanelli 32'; Olsson (yellow card) 76'	Stadium: Behrn Arena; Attendance: 6,572; Referee: Jonas Eriksson

=== Svenska Cupen ===
==== 2016–17 ====
===== Group stage =====
Pos	Team	Pld	W	D	L	GF	GA	GD	Pts	Qualification
1	AIK	3	2	1	0	4	0	+4	7	Advance to Knockout stage
2	Dalkurd FF	3	1	2	0	3	1	+2	5	
3	Kristianstad FC	3	1	0	2	3	7	−4	3	
4	GAIS	3	0	1	2	3	5	−2	1	

Source: Swedish Football Association
Rules for classification: 1) Points; 2) Goal difference; 3) Goals scored; 4) Head-to-head record; 5) Highest ranked team

19 February 2017 1	AIK	2–1	GAIS	Stockholm
14:00 CET (UTC+1)	Avdić 4'; Väisänen (yellow card) 13'; Affane (yellow card) 23'; Olsson (yellow card) 66'; Linnér (yellow card) 84'; Blomberg (yellow card) 86'	Report	Westermark (yellow card) 82'	Stadium: Skytteholms IP; Attendance: 3,495; Referee: Mohammed Al-Hakim

25 February 2017 2	Kristianstad	0–3	AIK	Kristianstad
14:00 CET (UTC+1)	Verngren (yellow card) 23'	Report	Ishizaki (yellow card) 6'; Blomberg 16'; Markkanen 21'; Karlsson 87'	Stadium: Kristianstads IP; Attendance: 1,866; Referee: Jonas Karlsson

5 March 2017 3	AIK	0–0	Dalkurd FF	Stockholm
16:00 CET (UTC+1)	Karlsson (yellow card) 31'	Report	DeJohn (yellow card) 70'; Bangura (yellow card) 90+3'	Stadium: Skytteholms IP; Attendance: 3,540; Referee: Patrik Eriksson

===== Knockout phase =====
12 March 2017 Quarterfinal	BK Häcken	3–0	AIK	Stockholm
18:30 CET (UTC+1)	Lindgren 70'; Kamara 89'; Paulinho 90+4' (pen.)	Report	Olsson (yellow card) 61'; Nyholm (yellow card) 73'	Stadium: Friends Arena; Attendance: 1,764; Referee: Stefan Johannesson

==== 2017–18 ====
23 August 2017 Second round	Värmbols	0–1	AIK	Katrineholm
18:00 CEST (UTC+2)	Karjalainen (yellow card) 45'; Lindgren (yellow card) 83'; Kellokumpu (yellow card) 87'	Report	Stefanelli 53' (pen.); Olsson (yellow card) 81'	Stadium: Värmbols IP; Attendance: 3,123; Referee: Johan Krantz

=== UEFA Europa League ===
==== Qualifying rounds ====
29 June 2017 First qualifying round 1st leg	KÍ (Faroe Islands)	0–0	(Sweden) AIK	Tórshavn, Faroe Islands
20:00 CEST (UTC+2)	Simonsen (yellow card) 60'	Report		Stadium: Gundadalur; Attendance: 1,374; Referee: Michal Ocenáš (Slovakia)

6 July 2017 First qualifying round 2nd leg	AIK (Sweden)	5–0 (5–0 agg.)	(Faroe Islands) KÍ	Stockholm, Sweden
19:00 CEST (UTC+2)	Markkanen 3', 6', 42'; Ishizaki 16'; Olsson 24'	Report		Stadium: Friends Arena; Attendance: 6,257; Referee: Laurent Kopriwa (Luxembourg)

13 July 2017 Second qualifying round 1st leg	FK Željezničar (Bosnia and Herzegovina)	0–0	(Sweden) AIK	Sarajevo, Bosnia and Herzegovina
20:45 CEST (UTC+2)	Projić (yellow card) 74'; Marković (yellow card) 88'; Zakarić (yellow card) 90+2'	Report		Stadium: Stadion Grbavica; Attendance: 11,170; Referee: Adrien Jaccottet (Switzerland)

20 July 2017 Second qualifying round 2nd leg	AIK (Sweden)	2–0 (2–0 agg.)	(Bosnia and Herzegovina) FK Željezničar	Stockholm, Sweden
19:00 CEST (UTC+2)	Karlsson (yellow card) 30'; Johansson (yellow card) 41' (goal) 48'; Goitom 85' (yellow card) 90+2'	Report	Blagojević (yellow card) 25'; Graovac (yellow card) 45+2'; Zeba (yellow card) 47'; Bogičević (yellow card) 51'; Projić (yellow card) 79'; Radinović (yellow card) 89'	Stadium: Friends Arena; Attendance: 9,126; Referee: Georgios Kominis (Greece)

27 July 2017 Third qualifying round 1st leg	AIK (Sweden)	1–1	(Portugal) Braga	Stockholm, Sweden
19:00 CEST (UTC+2)	Sundgren 18' (pen.)	Report	Silva 11'; Rosiċ (yellow card) 25'; Santos (yellow card) 59'	Stadium: Friends Arena; Attendance: 12,456; Referee: Marius Avram (Romania)

3 August 2017 Third qualifying round 2nd leg	Braga (Portugal)	2–1 (a.e.t.) (3–2 agg.)	(Sweden) AIK	Braga, Portugal
22:00 CEST (UTC+2)	Fonte 74'; Silva (yellow card) 113' (goal) 120+1'; Matheus (yellow card) 120+3'	Report	Obasi 13'; Ishizaki (yellow card) 73'; Olsson (yellow card) 120+3'	Stadium: Estádio Municipal de Braga; Attendance: 13,851; Referee: Frank Schneider (France)

== Squad statistics ==
As of match played 5 November 2017

=== Appearances and goals ===
No.	Pos	Nat	Player	Total		Allsvenskan		2016–17 Svenska Cupen		2017–18 Svenska Cupen		UEFA Europa League	
No.	Pos	Nat	Player	Apps	Goals	Apps	Goals	Apps	Goals	Apps	Goals	Apps	Goals
2	DF	(Iceland) ISL	Haukur Hauksson	15	1	10+2	1	0+3	0	0	0	0	0
3	DF	(Sweden) SWE	Per Karlsson	36	2	27	1	4	1	0	0	5	0
4	DF	(Sweden) SWE	Nils-Eric Johansson	37	3	28	2	3	0	1	0	5	1
5	DF	(Sweden) SWE	Jesper Nyholm	30	1	21+1	1	1	0	1	0	6	0
6	MF	(Sweden) SWE	Simon Thern	31	1	14+10	1	1+3	0	0	0	2+1	0
7	MF	(Sweden) SWE	Kristoffer Olsson	39	3	28+1	2	1+2	0	1	0	5+1	1
8	MF	(Sweden) SWE	Johan Blomberg	38	4	23+5	3	4	1	1	0	5	0
9	DF	(Sweden) SWE	Rasmus Lindkvist	19	4	16	4	0	0	0+1	0	2	0
10	FW	(Sweden) SWE	Denni Avdić	29	4	1+20	3	3	1	1	0	2+2	0
13	GK	(Canada) CAN	Kyriakos Stamatopoulos	2	0	1	0	0	0	1	0	0	0
14	MF	(Finland) FIN	Robert Taylor	5	0	3+1	0	0	0	1	0	0	0
15	DF	(Argentina) ARG	Agustin Gómez	1	0	0	0	0	0	1	0	0	0
17	FW	(Sweden) SWE	Daniel Mushitu	5	0	1+2	0	0+1	0	0	0	0+1	0
20	FW	(Nigeria) NGR	Chinedu Obasi	10	6	7+2	5	0	0	0	0	1	1
21	DF	(Sweden) SWE	Daniel Sundgren	38	5	27	4	4	0	1	0	6	1
22	FW	(Argentina) ARG	Nicolás Stefanelli	19	10	14+2	9	0	0	1	1	1+1	0
24	MF	(Sweden) SWE	Stefan Ishizaki	33	2	21+2	1	3+1	0	0	0	5+1	1
34	GK	(Sweden) SWE	Oscar Linnér	39	0	29	0	4	0	0	0	6	0
36	FW	(Eritrea) ERI	Henok Goitom	31	6	18+6	5	0+1	0	0+1	0	3+2	1
38	FW	(Sweden) SWE	Nebiyou Perry	1	0	0	0	0	0	0	0	0+1	0
39	MF	(Sweden) SWE	Amin Affane	22	1	11+4	1	4	0	1	0	2	0
Players away on loan:
11	FW	(Finland) FIN	Eero Markkanen	22	6	8+5	2	4	1	0	0	4+1	3
18	DF	(Sweden) SWE	Noah Sundberg	1	0	0	0	0+1	0	0	0	0	0
29	MF	(Sweden) SWE	Anton Salétros	15	0	4+6	0	0	0	0	0	4+1	0
Players who appeared for AIK but left during the season:
9	FW	(Bosnia and Herzegovina) BIH	Sulejman Krpić	6	0	4+2	0	0	0	0	0	0	0
14	DF	(Croatia) CRO	Stipe Vrdoljak	10	0	6	0	4	0	0	0	0	0
15	DF	(Finland) FIN	Sauli Väisänen	20	0	8+4	0	4	0	0	0	2+2	0

=== Goal scorers ===
Place	Position	Nation	Number	Name	Allsvenskan	2016–17 Svenska Cupen	2017–18 Svenska Cupen	UEFA Europa League	Total
1	FW	(Argentina)	22	Nicolás Stefanelli	9	0	1	0	10
2	FW	(Eritrea)	36	Henok Goitom	5	0	0	1	6
2	FW	(Nigeria)	20	Chinedu Obasi	5	0	0	1	6
4	DF	(Sweden)	21	Daniel Sundgren	4	0	0	1	5
4	FW	(Sweden)	10	Denni Avdić	3	1	0	0	4
4	FW	(Finland)	11	Eero Markkanen	2	0	0	3	5
7	DF	(Sweden)	9	Rasmus Lindkvist	4	0	0	0	4
7	MF	(Sweden)	8	Johan Blomberg	3	1	0	0	4
9	MF	(Sweden)	7	Kristoffer Olsson	2	0	0	1	3
9	DF	(Sweden)	4	Nils-Eric Johansson	2	0	0	1	3
9				Own goal	2	1	0	0	3
12	DF	(Sweden)	3	Per Karlsson	1	1	0	0	2
12	MF	(Sweden)	24	Stefan Ishizaki	1	0	0	1	2
14	DF	(Iceland)	2	Haukur Hauksson	1	0	0	0	1
14	DF	(Sweden)	5	Jesper Nyholm	1	0	0	0	1
14	MF	(Sweden)	6	Simon Thern	1	0	0	0	1
14	MF	(Sweden)	39	Amin Affane	1	0	0	0	1
TOTALS					47	4	1	9	61

=== Clean sheets ===
Place	Position	Nation	Number	Name	Allsvenskan	2016–17 Svenska Cupen	2017–18 Svenska Cupen	UEFA Europa League	Total
1	GK	(Sweden)	34	Oscar Linnér	12	3	0	4	19
2	GK	(Canada)	13	Kyriakos Stamatopoulos	1	0	1	0	2
TOTALS					13	3	1	4	21

=== Disciplinary record ===
Number	Nation	Position	Name	Allsvenskan		2016–17 Svenska Cupen		2017–18 Svenska Cupen		UEFA Europa League		Total	
Number	Nation	Position	Name	Yellow card	Red card	Yellow card	Red card	Yellow card	Red card	Yellow card	Red card	Yellow card	Red card
2	(Iceland)	DF	Haukur Hauksson	3	0	0	0	0	0	0	0	3	0
3	(Sweden)	DF	Per Karlsson	4	0	1	0	0	0	1	0	6	0
4	(Sweden)	DF	Nils-Eric Johansson	6	1	0	0	0	0	2	0	8	1
5	(Sweden)	DF	Jesper Nyholm	1	0	1	0	0	0	0	0	2	0
6	(Sweden)	MF	Simon Thern	1	0	0	0	0	0	0	0	1	0
7	(Sweden)	MF	Kristoffer Olsson	6	0	2	0	1	0	1	0	10	0
8	(Sweden)	MF	Johan Blomberg	3	0	1	0	0	0	0	0	4	0
20	(Nigeria)	FW	Chinedu Obasi	2	0	0	0	0	0	0	0	2	0
21	(Sweden)	DF	Daniel Sundgren	6	0	0	0	0	0	0	0	6	0
22	(Argentina)	FW	Nicolás Stefanelli	2	0	0	0	0	0	0	0	2	0
24	(Sweden)	MF	Stefan Ishizaki	3	0	1	0	0	0	1	0	5	0
34	(Sweden)	GK	Oscar Linnér	4	0	1	0	0	0	0	0	5	0
36	(Eritrea)	FW	Henok Goitom	1	0	0	0	0	0	1	0	2	0
39	(Sweden)	MF	Amin Affane	3	0	1	0	0	0	0	0	4	0
Players away on loan:
11	(Finland)	FW	Eero Markkanen	3	0	0	0	0	0	0	0	3	0
29	(Sweden)	MF	Anton Salétros	1	0	0	0	0	0	0	0	1	0
Players who left AIK during the season:
9	(Bosnia and Herzegovina)	FW	Sulejman Krpić	1	0	0	0	0	0	0	0	1	0
14	(Croatia)	DF	Stipe Vrdoljak	3	0	0	0	0	0	0	0	3	0
15	(Finland)	DF	Sauli Väisänen	1	0	0	0	0	0	0	0	1	0
Total				55	1	9	0	1	0	6	0	71	1
