= 2018 AIK Fotboll season =

AIK
2018 season
- Chairman: Eric Ljunggren
- Manager: Rikard Norling
- Stadium: Friends Arena
- Allsvenskan: 1st
- Svenska Cupen: Semi-finals
- UEFA Europa League: Second qualifying round
- Top goalscorer: League: Henok Goitom (11); All: Henok Goitom (12)
- Highest home attendance: 50,128 (4 November 2018 vs GIF Sundsvall, Allsvenskan)
- Lowest home attendance: 7,679 (13 March 2018 vs Örebro SK, Svenska Cupen)
- Average home league attendance: 23,664 (in Allsvenskan); 19,940 (in all competitions)
Home colours	Away colours	Third colours

The 2018 season was AIK's 127th in existence, their 90th season in Allsvenskan and their 13th consecutive season in the league. The team was competing in Allsvenskan, Svenska Cupen and UEFA Europa League.

== Squad ==
As of match played 11 November 2018

No.	Name	Nationality	Position	Date of birth (age)	Signed from	Signed in	Contract ends	Apps.	Goals	Notes
Goalkeepers
13	Kyriakos Stamatopoulos	(Canada)	GK	28 August 1979 (aged 39)	Tromsø	2011	2020	63	0	
23	Budimir Janošević	(Serbia)	GK	21 October 1989 (aged 29)	IF Brommapojkarna	2018	2020	10	0	
34	Oscar Linnér	(Sweden)	GK	23 February 1997 (aged 21)	Academy	2015	2020	76	0	
35	Samuel Brolin	(Sweden)	GK	1 May 1998 (aged 20)	Academy	2018	2019	0	0	
Defenders
2	Haukur Hauksson	(Iceland)	DF	1 September 1991 (aged 27)	KR	2015	2019	83	7	
3	Per Karlsson	(Sweden)	DF	2 January 1986 (aged 32)	Academy	2003	2020	280	2	Club Captain
5	Jesper Nyholm	(Sweden)	DF	10 September 1993 (aged 25)	Dalkurd	2017	2019	34	1	
6	Alexander Milošević	(Sweden)	DF	30 January 1992 (aged 26)	Vasalund	2018	2018	121	5	
9	Rasmus Lindkvist	(Sweden)	DF	16 May 1990 (aged 28)	Vålerenga	2017	2020	52	7	
15	Robert Lundström	(Sweden)	DF	1 November 1989 (aged 29)	Vålerenga	2018	2020	10	1	
21	Daniel Sundgren	(Sweden)	DF	22 November 1990 (aged 27)	Degerfors	2016	2019	98	7	
24	Robin Jansson	(Sweden)	DF	15 November 1991 (aged 26)	IK Oddevold	2018	2019	29	3	
26	Joel Ekstrand	(Sweden)	DF	4 February 1989 (aged 29)	Rotherham United	2018	2020	6	0	
Midfielders
7	Kristoffer Olsson	(Sweden)	MF	30 June 1995 (aged 23)	Midtjylland	2017	2020	77	9	
8	Enoch Adu	(Ghana)	MF	14 September 1990 (aged 28)	Akhisarspor	2018	2020	36	0	
14	Heradi Rashidi	(Sweden)	MF	24 July 1994 (aged 24)	Dalkurd	2018	2020	19	1	
16	Sebastian Larsson	(Sweden)	MF	6 June 1985 (aged 33)	Hull City	2018	2020	18	2	
20	Tarik Elyounoussi	(Norway)	MF	23 February 1988 (aged 30)	Olympiacos	2018	2019	34	11	
25	Panajotis Dimitriadis	(Sweden)	MF	12 August 1986 (aged 32)	Giresunspor	2018	2020	31	1	
Forwards
10	Denni Avdić	(Sweden)	FW	5 September 1988 (aged 30)	AZ Alkmaar	2016	2018	76	8	
11	Stefan Silva	(Sweden)	FW	11 March 1990 (aged 28)	Palermo	2018	2021	13	2	
22	Nicolás Stefanelli	(Argentina)	FW	22 November 1994 (aged 23)	Defensa y Justicia	2017	2020	44	17	
36	Henok Goitom	(Eritrea)	FW	22 September 1984 (aged 34)	San Jose Earthquakes	2017	2018	185	71	
Out on loan
18	Bilal Hussein	(Sweden)	MF	22 April 2000 (aged 18)	Academy	2017		0	0	
31	Christos Gravius	(Sweden)	MF	14 October 1997 (aged 21)	Academy	2015		17	0	
	Adam Ben Lamin	(Sweden)	DF	2 June 2001 (aged 17)	Academy	2019		0	0	
	Rickson Mansiamina	(Sweden)	MF	9 July 1997 (aged 21)	Academy	2016		1	0	
	Daniel Mushitu	(Sweden)	FW	22 February 2000 (aged 18)	Västerås	2017		5	0	
Left during the season
14	Robert Taylor	(Finland)	MF	21 October 1994 (aged 24)	RoPS	2017	2020	6	0	
16	Anton Salétros	(Sweden)	MF	12 April 1996 (aged 22)	Academy	2013		104	5	
17	Nabil Bahoui	(Sweden)	MF	5 February 1991 (aged 27)	on loan from Grasshopper	2018	2018	90	36	
19	Ahmed Yasin	(Iraq)	MF	22 April 1991 (aged 27)	AGF	2016	2018	48	4	

=== Players out on loan ===
Note: Flags indicate national team as defined under FIFA eligibility rules; some limited exceptions apply. Players may hold more than one non-FIFA nationality.

No.	Pos.	Nation	Player
18	MF	SWE	Bilal Hussein (at Vasalund until 31 December 2018)
31	MF	SWE	Christos Gravius (at Degerfors until 31 December 2018)

No.	Pos.	Nation	Player
–	DF	SWE	Adam Ben Lamin (at Vasalund until 31 December 2018)
–	MF	SWE	Rickson Mansiamina (at Vasalund until 31 December 2018)

== Transfers ==
=== In ===
Date	Position	Nationality	Name	From	Fee	Ref.
1 January 2018	MF	(Ghana)	Enoch Adu	Akhisarspor	Undisclosed	
1 January 2018	GK	(Serbia)	Budimir Janošević	Brommapojkarna	Undisclosed	
1 January 2018	DF	(Sweden)	Robert Lundström	Vålerenga	Undisclosed	
9 January 2018	FW	(Sweden)	Stefan Silva	Palermo	Undisclosed	
15 January 2018	DF	(Sweden)	Joel Ekstrand	Rotherham United	Undisclosed	
30 January 2018	MF	(Norway)	Tarik Elyounoussi	Olympiacos	Undisclosed	
28 February 2018	DF	(Sweden)	Alexander Milošević	Beşiktaş	Undisclosed	
3 April 2018	DF	(Sweden)	Robin Jansson	IK Oddevold	Undisclosed	
11 June 2018	MF	(Sweden)	Sebastian Larsson	Hull City	Undisclosed	
4 July 2018	MF	(Sweden)	Heradi Rashidi	Dalkurd	Undisclosed	
4 July 2018	MF	(Sweden)	Panajotis Dimitriadis	Giresunspor	Undisclosed	

=== Loans in ===
Start date	Position	Nationality	Name	From	End date	Ref.
20 February 2018	MF	(Sweden)	Nabil Bahoui	Grasshoppers	30 June 2018	

=== Out ===
Date	Position	Nationality	Name	To	Fee	Ref.
8 January 2018	DF	(Sweden)	Noah Sundberg	Östersund	Undisclosed	
17 January 2018	MF	(Sweden)	Amin Affane	IFK Göteborg	Undisclosed	
17 January 2018	GK	(Sweden)	Gustav Nyberg	IK Sirius	Undisclosed	
6 June 2018	MF	(Sweden)	Anton Salétros	Rostov	Undisclosed	
2 August 2018	MF	(Iraq)	Ahmed Yasin	Al-Khor	Undisclosed	
31 August 2018	MF	(Finland)	Robert Taylor	Tromsø	Undisclosed	

=== Loans out ===
Start date	Position	Nationality	Name	To	End date	Ref.
4 January 2018	MF	(Sweden)	Christos Gravius	Degerfors IF	31 December 2018	
15 January 2018	FW	(Finland)	Eero Markkanen	Randers	30 June 2018	
15 February 2018	FW	(Sweden)	Daniel Mushitu	Vasalund	30 June 2018	
28 March 2018	MF	(Finland)	Robert Taylor	Tromsø	31 August 2018	

=== Released ===
Date	Position	Nationality	Name	Joined	Date	Ref
18 February 2018	DF	(Sweden)	Nils-Eric Johansson	Retirement		
10 August 2018	FW	(Finland)	Eero Markkanen	Dalkurd	10 August 2018	
31 December 2018	DF	(Iceland)	Haukur Hauksson	KA		
31 December 2018	DF	(Sweden)	Alexander Milošević	Nottingham Forest	1 February 2019	
31 December 2018	MF	(Sweden)	Rickson Mansiamina	Enskede		
31 December 2018	FW	(Sweden)	Denni Avdić	AFC Eskilstuna		

== Friendlies ==
20 January 2018	IK Frej	0–1	AIK	Täby
14:00 CET (UTC+1)		Report	Stefanelli 22'	Stadium: Vikingavallen; Attendance: 2,107; Referee: Victor Wolf

27 January 2018	AIK	3–0	Inter Turku	Stockholm
13:00 CET (UTC+1)	Stefanelli 22', 59'; Silva 80'	Report		Stadium: Skytteholms IP; Attendance: 1,859; Referee: Glenn Nyberg

3 February 2018	Midtjylland	3–1	AIK	Dubai, United Arab Emirates
11:00 CET (UTC+1)	Wikheim 74'; Sviatchenko 78'; Duelund 90'	Report	Salétros 35' (yellow card) 60'; Antonsson (yellow card) 62'; Mörfelt (yellow card) 75'; Mushitu (yellow card) 87'	Stadium: Maktoum bin Rashid Stadium; Referee: Ahmed Eisa

7 February 2018	Shakhtar Donetsk	2–0	AIK	Dubai, United Arab Emirates
11:00 CET (UTC+1)	Rakitskiy (yellow card) 4'; Marlos (yellow card) 4' (yellow-red card) 53' (goal) 47'; Ferreyra 90+2'	Report	Adu (yellow card) 66'	Stadium: Nad Al Sheba Sports Complex; Referee: Sultan Mohamed Saleh

25 March 2018	AIK	1–3	Helsingborg	Stockholm
16:00 CEST (UTC+2)	Karlsson (yellow card) 13'; Olsson (yellow card) 38'; Stefanelli 74'	Report	Moro 30'; Weberg 60' (yellow card) 76'; Dahlberg 67'	Stadium: Friends Arena; Attendance: 1,412; Referee: Per Melin

21 June 2018	AIK	2–1	Vasalund	Stockholm
CEST (UTC+2)	Stefanelli; Sundgren	Report	Beko	Stadium: Karlberg Arena; Referee: Johan Hamlin

1 July 2018	AIK	1–0	Flora Tallinn	Norrtälje
13:00 CEST (UTC+2)	Yasin (penalty missed) 56'; Milošević 57'	Report	Saliste (yellow card) 55'	Stadium: Norrtälje Sportcentrum; Attendance: 812; Referee: Granit Maqedonci

== Competitions ==
=== Overview ===
Competition	First match	Last match	Starting round	Final position	Record							
Competition	First match	Last match	Starting round	Final position	Pld	W	D	L	GF	GA	GD	Win %
Allsvenskan	2 April 2018	11 November 2018	Matchday 1	Winners	30	19	10	1	50	16	+34	63.33
2017–18 Svenska Cupen	17 February 2018	18 March 2018	From 2017 season	Semifinal	5	4	0	1	9	5	+4	80.00
2018–19 Svenska Cupen	23 August 2018	Progress to 2019 season	Second Round	Progress to 2019 season	1	1	0	0	2	0	+2	100.00
UEFA Europa League	12 July 2018	2 August 2018	First qualifying round	Second qualifying round	4	1	1	2	2	3	−1	25.00
Total					40	25	11	4	63	24	+39	62.50

Last updated: 11 November 2018
Source: Competitions

=== Allsvenskan ===
==== League table ====
Pos	Team	Pld	W	D	L	GF	GA	GD	Pts	Qualification or relegation
1	AIK (C)	30	19	10	1	50	16	+34	67	Qualification for the Champions League first qualifying round
2	IFK Norrköping	30	19	8	3	51	27	+24	65	Qualification for the Europa League first qualifying round
3	Malmö FF	30	17	7	6	57	29	+28	58	Qualification for the Europa League first qualifying round
4	Hammarby IF	30	17	7	6	56	35	+21	58	
5	BK Häcken	30	16	5	9	58	27	+31	53	Qualification for the Europa League second qualifying round (Note: BK Häcken qualified for the Europa League second qualifying round by winning the 2018–19 Svenska Cupen.)

Source: svenskfotboll.se (in Swedish)
Rules for classification: 1) Points; 2) Goal difference; 3) Goals scored; 4) Head-to-head points; 5) Head-to-head goal difference; 6) Head-to-head away goals scored; 7) Play-off
(Note: Play-off is only played if need to decide champion, teams for relegation or UEFA competition and will be played on a neutral ground).
(C) Champions

==== Results summary ====
Overall								Home						Away					
Pld	W	D	L	GF	GA	GD	Pts	W	D	L	GF	GA	GD	W	D	L	GF	GA	GD
30	19	10	1	50	16	+34	67	10	5	0	27	7	+20	9	5	1	23	9	+14

Last updated: 11 November 2018.
Source: (in Swedish)

==== Results by round ====
Round	1	2	3	4	5	6	7	8	9	10	11	12	13	14	15	16	17	18	19	20	21	22	23	24	25	26	27	28	29	30
Ground	H	A	H	A	H	H	A	A	H	A	A	H	A	A	H	H	H	A	H	H	A	H	A	A	H	A	H	A	H	A
Result	W	D	W	D	W	W	W	D	D	W	D	D	W	W	W	W	W	W	W	W	L	W	W	W	D	D	D	W	D	W
Position	3	2	2	2	2	2	2	2	2	3	3	2	1	1	1	1	1	1	1	1	1	1	1	1	1	1	1	1	1	1

Updated to match(es) played on 11 November 2018. Source: see Results
A = Away; H = Home; W = Win; D = Draw; L = Loss

==== Results ====
2 April 2018 1	AIK	2–0	Dalkurd	Stockholm
15:00 CEST (UTC+2)	Goitom (yellow card) 28'; Lundström 33' (yellow card) 34'; Adu (yellow card) 82'; Salétros 90+2'	Report	Pllana (yellow card) 87'; Strand (yellow card) 90+3'	Stadium: Friends Arena; Attendance: 30,334; Referee: Andreas Ekberg

9 April 2018 2	Malmö FF	1–1	AIK	Malmö
19:00 CEST (UTC+2)	Rosenberg 44' (pen.) (yellow card) 8'; Brorsson (yellow card) 9' (yellow-red card) 58'; Nielsen (yellow card) 45+1'	Report	Goitom 12' (yellow card) 45+1'; Milošević (yellow card) 38'; Bahoui (yellow card) 45'; Lundström (yellow card) 73'	Stadium: Stadion; Attendance: 20,072; Referee: Stefan Johannesson

15 April 2018 3	AIK	2–0	Djurgårdens IF	Stockholm
15:00 CEST (UTC+2)	Lindkvist 15' (yellow card) 90+3'; Sundgren (yellow card) 26'; Olsson (yellow card) 30'; Elyounoussi 46'; Salétros (yellow card) 88'	Report	Olsson (yellow card) 21'; Ulvestad (yellow card) 23'; Movsisyan (red card) 90+2'; Badji (yellow card) 90+3'	Stadium: Friends Arena; Attendance: 30,552; Referee: Jonas Eriksson

18 April 2018 4	Örebro SK	1–1	AIK	Örebro
19:00 CEST (UTC+2)	Lorentzson 29' (yellow card) 26'; Gerzić (yellow card) 42'; Mårtensson (yellow card) 60'; Hines-Ike (yellow card) 83'	Report	Goitom 52'; Stefanelli (yellow card) 54' (yellow-red card) 90+1'; Jansson (yellow card) 77'	Stadium: Behrn Arena; Attendance: 8,012; Referee: Andreas Ekberg

22 April 2018 5	AIK	2–0	IFK Göteborg	Stockholm
17:30 CEST (UTC+2)	Silva 20'; Olsson 50' (yellow card) 77'; Bahoui (yellow card) 70'; Avdić (yellow card) 83'	Report	Starfelt (yellow card) 18'; Diskerud (yellow card) 70'	Stadium: Friends Arena; Attendance: 19,619; Referee: Mohammed Al-Hakim

27 April 2018 6	AIK	2–0	IK Sirius	Stockholm
19:00 CEST (UTC+2)	Bahoui 21', 58'; Milošević (yellow card) 59'; Jansson (yellow card) 65'; Janošević (yellow card) 79'	Report		Stadium: Friends Arena; Attendance: 15,187; Referee: Kristoffer Karlsson

2 May 2018 16	IK Sirius	2–3	AIK	Uppsala
19:00 CEST (UTC+2)	Gustafsson 15'; Ogbu 28'; Björkström (yellow card) 89'	Report	Salétros 7'; Adu (yellow card) 18'; Bahoui (yellow card) 61'; Stefanelli 64', 80'	Stadium: Studenternas IP; Attendance: 6,139; Referee: Glenn Nyberg

6 May 2018 7	IF Elfsborg	0–0	AIK	Borås
17:30 CEST (UTC+2)	Holmén (yellow card) 43'; Drešević (yellow card) 69'	Report	Lindkvist (yellow card) 51'	Stadium: Borås Arena; Attendance: 7,071; Referee: Kaspar Sjöberg

14 May 2018 8	AIK	1–1	Östersunds FK	Stockholm
19:00 CEST (UTC+2)	Bahoui 21'; Karlsson (yellow card) 83'	Report	Ghoddos 84'; Pettersson (yellow card) 90+4'	Stadium: Friends Arena; Attendance: 16,553; Referee: Stefan Johannesson

20 May 2018 9	Hammarby IF	0–1	AIK	Stockholm
15:00 CEST (UTC+2)		Report	Milošević (yellow card) 39'; Elyounoussi 81' (pen.); Yasin (yellow card) 90+3'	Stadium: Tele2 Arena; Attendance: 29,266; Referee: Andreas Ekberg

23 May 2018 10	BK Häcken	1–1	AIK	Gothenburg
19:00 CEST (UTC+2)	Paulinho 10'; Friberg (yellow card) 57'; Faltsetas (yellow card) 81'	Report	Jansson (yellow card) 8'; Salétros 55'; Sundgren (yellow card) 90+2'	Stadium: Bravida Arena; Attendance: 4,259; Referee: Glenn Nyberg

26 May 2018 11	AIK	3–3	IFK Norrköping	Stockholm
16:00 CEST (UTC+2)	Olsson 28'; Yasin 38'; Lindkvist 79'	Report	Krogh Gerson (yellow card) 49'; Thern (yellow card) 51'; Johansson 53'; Dagerstål 62'; Moberg Karlsson 68'	Stadium: Friends Arena; Attendance: 21,012; Referee: Martin Strömbergsson

7 July 2018 12	Trelleborgs FF	1–4	AIK	Trelleborg
19:30 CEST (UTC+2)	Nielsen (yellow card) 52'; Hümmet 65'	Report	Elyounoussi 57', 74'; Olsson 63'; Sundgren (yellow card) 89'; Goitom 90+5'	Stadium: Vångavallen; Attendance: 2,682; Referee: Mohammed Al-Hakim

15 July 2018 13	GIF Sundsvall	0–1	AIK	Sundsvall
14:00 CEST (UTC+2)	Olsson (yellow card) 71'	Report	Milošević (yellow card) 28'; Rashidi 90+4'	Stadium: Idrottsparken; Attendance: 5,177; Referee: Patrik Eriksson

22 July 2018 14	AIK	5–1	IF Brommapojkarna	Stockholm
15:00 CEST (UTC+2)	Stefanelli 39', 46', 56'; Goitom 52' (pen.); Elyounoussi 87'	Report	Nilsson 18'; Rauschenberg (yellow card) 51'; Ochieng (yellow card) 86'	Stadium: Friends Arena; Attendance: 12,781; Referee: Kristoffer Karlsson

29 July 2018 15	AIK	1–0	Kalmar FF	Stockholm
15:00 CEST (UTC+2)	Goitom 51' (pen.); Elyounoussi (yellow card) 60'	Report	Akas (yellow card) 65'	Stadium: Friends Arena; Attendance: 13,822; Referee: Robert Daradic

12 August 2018 17	AIK	1–0	IF Elfsborg	Stockholm
17:30 CEST (UTC+2)	Goitom 58'	Report	Holst (yellow card) 36'; Holmén (yellow card) 54'; Lundevall (yellow card) 61'	Stadium: Friends Arena; Attendance: 13,537; Referee: Martin Strömbergsson

19 August 2018 18	IF Brommapojkarna	0–2	AIK	Stockholm
17:30 CEST (UTC+2)	Omondi (yellow card) 77'	Report	Larsson (yellow card) 15'; Goitom 45', 56'; Jansson (yellow card) 88'	Stadium: Grimsta IP; Attendance: 6,820; Referee: Bojan Pandžić

26 August 2018 19	AIK	2–0	Trelleborgs FF	Stockholm
17:30 CEST (UTC+2)	Jansson 11'; Goitom 63'	Report	Ohlsson (yellow card) 18'; Sudić (yellow card) 88'	Stadium: Friends Arena; Attendance: 13,061; Referee: Kaspar Sjöberg

1 September 2018 20	AIK	3–0	BK Häcken	Stockholm
16:00 CEST (UTC+2)	Larsson 27' (yellow card) 31'; Goitom 35' (pen.); Elyounoussi 45'; Karlsson (yellow card) 52'	Report	Faltsetas (yellow card) 16'; Lindgren (yellow card) 27'; Çelik (yellow card) 28'; Friberg (yellow card) 32'; Jeremejeff (yellow card) 54'	Stadium: Friends Arena; Attendance: 17,163; Referee: Kristoffer Karlsson

16 September 2018 21	IFK Norrköping	2–0	AIK	Norrköping
15:00 CEST (UTC+2)	Castegren (yellow card) 37'; Krogh Gerson (yellow card) 44'; Thern 53', 62'; Pettersson (yellow card) 80'	Report	Sundgren (yellow card) 87'	Stadium: Östgötaporten; Attendance: 14,202; Referee: Andreas Ekberg

23 September 2018 22	AIK	1–0	Hammarby IF	Stockholm
15:00 CEST (UTC+2)	Elyounoussi (yellow card) 22'; Milošević (yellow card) 24'; Goitom 76'; Linnér (yellow card) 87'; Sundgren (yellow card) 89'	Report	Borges (yellow card) 15'; Martinsson Ngouali (yellow card) 29'; Đurđić (yellow card) 32'	Stadium: Friends Arena; Attendance: 49,034; Referee: Stefan Johannesson

27 September 2018 23	IFK Göteborg	0–2	AIK	Gothenburg
19:00 CEST (UTC+2)	Boo Wiklander (yellow card) 76'	Report	Elyounoussi 24'; Goitom 89'	Stadium: Gamla Ullevi; Attendance: 12,104; Referee: Martin Strömbergsson

30 September 2018 24	Dalkurd FF	0–4	AIK	Gävle
15:00 CEST (UTC+2)	Lawan (yellow card) 42'	Report	Milošević (yellow card) 15'; Dimitriadis (yellow card) 18'; Olsson 33'; Sundgren 43' (pen.); Ekblad 59' (o.g.); Stefanelli 74'	Stadium: Gavlevallen; Attendance: 3,662; Referee: Johan Hamlin

7 October 2018 25	AIK	1–1	Örebro SK	Stockholm
17:30 CEST (UTC+2)	Rashidi (yellow card) 22' (yellow-red card) 85'; Olsson 31'	Report	Gerzić (yellow card) 27'; Rogić 90+3'	Stadium: Friends Arena; Attendance: 21,023; Referee: Johan Krantz

21 October 2018 26	Djurgårdens IF	0–0	AIK	Stockholm
15:00 CEST (UTC+2)	Johansson (yellow card) 28'; Olsson (yellow card) 77'	Report	Adu (yellow card) 4'; Milošević (yellow card) 25'; Elyounoussi (yellow card) 39'	Stadium: Tele2 Arena; Attendance: 21,711; Referee: Stefan Johannesson

29 October 2018 27	AIK	1–1	Malmö FF	Stockholm
19:00 CET (UTC+1)	Sundgren (yellow card) 56'; Stefanelli (yellow card) 90+1'; Larsson 90+6' (yellow card) 70' (yellow-red card) 90+10'	Report	Rosenberg (yellow card) 37'; Christiansen 44'; Innocent (yellow card) 90+1'; Nielsen (yellow card) 90+6'; Rieks (yellow card) 90+10'	Stadium: Friends Arena; Attendance: 31,160; Referee: Bojan Pandžić

1 November 2018 28	Östersunds FK	1–2	AIK	Östersund
19:00 CET (UTC+1)	Sonko Sundberg (yellow card) 30'; Pettersson (yellow card) 36'; Karlsson 78' (o.g.); Mukiibi (yellow card) 90+3'	Report	Adu (red card) 4'; Dimitriadis 30'; Elyounoussi 34'	Stadium: Jämtkraft Arena; Attendance: 6,531; Referee: Martin Strömbergsson

4 November 2018 29	AIK	0–0	GIF Sundsvall	Stockholm
17:30 CET (UTC+1)	Olsson (yellow card) 74'	Report	Björkander (yellow card) 55'	Stadium: Friends Arena; Attendance: 50,128; Referee: Andreas Ekberg

11 November 2018 30	Kalmar FF	0–1	AIK	Kalmar
15:00 CET (UTC+1)	Akas (yellow card) 29'; Hellborg (yellow card) 45'; Romário (yellow card) 45'	Report	Jansson 45'	Stadium: Guldfågeln Arena; Attendance: 11,991; Referee: Kristoffer Karlsson

=== Svenska Cupen ===
==== 2017–18 ====
===== Group stage =====
Pos	Team	Pld	W	D	L	GF	GA	GD	Pts	Qualification
1	AIK	3	3	0	0	7	3	+4	9	Advance to Knockout stage
2	Halmstads BK	3	1	1	1	7	4	+3	4	
3	Syrianska FC	3	1	0	2	6	10	−4	3	
4	IK Oddevold	3	0	1	2	5	8	−3	1	

Source: Swedish Football Association
Rules for classification: 1) Points; 2) Goal difference; 3) Goals scored; 4) Head-to-head record; 5) Highest ranked team

17 February 2018 1	AIK	2–1	Syrianska	Stockholm
14:00 CET (UTC+1)	Goitom 13'; Yasin 52'; Adu (yellow card) 83'; Olsson (yellow card) 89'	Report	Ercan 30' (yellow card) 30'; Yarar (yellow card) 52'	Stadium: Tele2 Arena; Attendance: 8,000; Referee: Johan Krantz

24 February 2018 2	Oddevold	1–2	AIK	Uddevalla
16:00 CET (UTC+1)	Fezarit (yellow card) 37'; Selmani 42' (pen.); Jansson (yellow card) 79'	Report	Elyounoussi 9' (yellow card) 32'; Bahoui 25'; Hauksson (yellow card) 45'	Stadium: Kamratgården; Attendance: 1,118; Referee: Mohammed Al-Hakim

4 March 2018 3	AIK	3–1	Halmstad	Stockholm
15:00 CET (UTC+1)	Elyounoussi 6' (pen.); Adu (yellow card) 10'; Olsson 68'; Lindkvist 88'	Report	Mathisen (yellow card) 5'; Hadenius (yellow card) 21'; Silfwer 61' (pen.)	Stadium: Tele2 Arena; Attendance: 7,828; Referee: Jonas Eriksson

===== Knock-out stage =====
13 March 2018 Quarterfinal	AIK	2–0	Örebro	Stockholm
18:30 CET (UTC+1)	Elyounoussi 12'; Adu (yellow card) 36'; Hauksson (yellow card) 70'; Silva 90+1'	Report	Omoh (red card) 29'	Stadium: Friends Arena; Attendance: 7,679; Referee: Kristoffer Karlsson

18 March 2018 Semifinal	AIK	0–2	Djurgårdens IF	Stockholm
18:15 CET (UTC+1)	Olsson (yellow card) 72'	Report	Kadewere 46'; Mrabti 67'; Augustinsson (yellow card) 70'; Karlström (yellow card) 84'	Stadium: Friends Arena; Attendance: 21,200; Referee: Andreas Ekberg

==== 2018–19 ====
23 August 2018 Second Round	Sandviken	0–2	AIK	Sandviken
18:00 CEST (UTC+2)	Koydan (yellow card) 30'	Report	Milošević 29'; Jansson 59'	Stadium: Jernvallen; Attendance: 2,119; Referee: Mohammed Al-Hakim

=== UEFA Europa League ===
==== Qualifying rounds ====
12 July 2018 First qualifying round 1st leg	Shamrock Rovers (Republic of Ireland)	0–1	(Sweden) AIK	Dublin, Republic of Ireland
20:05 CEST (UTC+2)	Watts (yellow card) 22'	Report	Olsson (yellow card) 67'; Sundgren 74'	Stadium: Tallaght Stadium; Attendance: 2,817; Referee: Alexander Harkam (Austria)

19 July 2018 First qualifying round 2nd leg	AIK (Sweden)	1–1 (a.e.t.) (2–1 agg.)	(Republic of Ireland) Shamrock Rovers	Stockholm, Sweden
19:00 CEST (UTC+2)	Goitom (yellow card) 78'; Stefanelli 94'; Sundgren (yellow card) 94'	Report	Carr 19'; Watts (yellow card) 50'; Grace (yellow card) 78'; A.Bolger (yellow card) 90+5'; Lopes (yellow card) 90+6'	Stadium: Friends Arena; Attendance: 8,115; Referee: Nicolas Laforge (Belgium)

26 July 2018 Second qualifying round 1st leg	FC Nordsjælland (Denmark)	1–0	(Sweden) AIK	Farum, Denmark
19:45 CEST (UTC+2)	Andersen 11'; Nelsson (yellow card) 50'	Report	Elyounoussi (yellow card) 40'; Jansson (yellow card) 81'	Stadium: Farum Park; Attendance: 3,474; Referee: Sébastien Delferiere (Belgium)

2 August 2018 Second qualifying round 2nd leg	AIK (Sweden)	0–1 (0–2 agg.)	(Denmark) FC Nordsjælland	Stockholm, Sweden
19:00 CEST (UTC+2)	Larsson (yellow card) 15'; Sundgren (yellow card) 56'	Report	Olsen 29'; Bartolec (yellow card) 36'; Skovgaard (yellow card) 52'; Jenssen (yellow card) 66'; Larsen (yellow card) 85'	Stadium: Tele2 Arena; Attendance: 10,946; Referee: Jérôme Brisard (France)

== Squad statistics ==
As of match played 11 November 2018

=== Appearances and goals ===
No.	Pos	Nat	Player	Total		Allsvenskan		2017–18 Svenska Cupen		2018–19 Svenska Cupen		UEFA Europa League	
No.	Pos	Nat	Player	Apps	Goals	Apps	Goals	Apps	Goals	Apps	Goals	Apps	Goals
2	DF	(Iceland) ISL	Haukur Hauksson	11	0	2+2	0	5	0	0	0	1+1	0
3	DF	(Sweden) SWE	Per Karlsson	38	0	30	0	4	0	0	0	4	0
5	DF	(Sweden) SWE	Jesper Nyholm	4	0	0	0	4	0	0	0	0	0
6	DF	(Sweden) SWE	Alexander Milošević	34	1	26+1	0	1+1	0	1	1	4	0
7	MF	(Sweden) SWE	Kristoffer Olsson	38	6	29	5	4	1	1	0	3+1	0
8	MF	(Ghana) GHA	Enoch Adu	36	0	27	0	4	0	1	0	3+1	0
9	DF	(Sweden) SWE	Rasmus Lindkvist	33	3	18+7	2	5	1	1	0	2	0
10	FW	(Sweden) SWE	Denni Avdić	24	0	19+1	0	0	0	1	0	1+2	0
11	FW	(Sweden) SWE	Stefan Silva	13	2	1+5	1	1+2	1	1	0	1+2	0
14	MF	(Sweden) SWE	Heradi Rashidi	19	1	14+2	1	0	0	1	0	1+1	0
15	DF	(Sweden) SWE	Robert Lundström	10	1	5	1	5	0	0	0	0	0
16	MF	(Sweden) SWE	Sebastian Larsson	18	2	12+3	2	0	0	0+1	0	2	0
20	MF	(Norway) NOR	Tarik Elyounoussi	34	11	22+3	8	4+1	3	0	0	4	0
21	DF	(Sweden) SWE	Daniel Sundgren	28	2	22+2	1	0	0	0	0	4	1
22	FW	(Argentina) ARG	Nicolás Stefanelli	25	7	6+12	6	2+1	0	1	0	2+1	1
23	GK	(Serbia) SRB	Budimir Janošević	10	0	9	0	0	0	1	0	0	0
24	DF	(Sweden) SWE	Robin Jansson	29	3	25	2	0	0	1	1	3	0
25	MF	(Sweden) SWE	Panajotis Dimitriadis	14	1	8+4	1	0	0	1	0	1	0
26	DF	(Sweden) SWE	Joel Ekstrand	6	0	0+1	0	0+1	0	0	0	4	0
34	GK	(Sweden) SWE	Oscar Linnér	30	0	21	0	5	0	0	0	4	0
36	FW	(Eritrea) ERI	Henok Goitom	40	13	28+2	12	3+2	1	0+1	0	2+2	0
Players away on loan:
18	MF	(Sweden) SWE	Bilal Hussein	3	0	0+1	0	0+1	0	0+1	0	0	0
Players who appeared for AIK but left during the season:
14	MF	(Finland) FIN	Robert Taylor	1	0	0	0	1	0	0	0	0	0
16	MF	(Sweden) SWE	Anton Salétros	14	3	7+5	3	0+2	0	0	0	0	0
17	MF	(Sweden) SWE	Nabil Bahoui	15	4	8+3	3	4	1	0	0	0	0
19	MF	(Iraq) IRQ	Ahmed Yasin	21	2	9+5	1	3+2	1	0	0	2	0

=== Goal scorers ===
Place	Position	Nation	Number	Name	Allsvenskan	2017–18 Svenska Cupen	2018–19 Svenska Cupen	UEFA Europa League	Total
1	FW	(Eritrea)	36	Henok Goitom	12	1	0	0	13
2	MF	(Norway)	20	Tarik Elyounoussi	8	3	0	0	11
3	FW	(Argentina)	22	Nicolás Stefanelli	6	0	0	1	7
4	MF	(Sweden)	7	Kristoffer Olsson	5	1	0	0	6
5	MF	(Sweden)	17	Nabil Bahoui	3	1	0	0	4
6	MF	(Sweden)	16	Anton Salétros	3	0	0	0	3
6	DF	(Sweden)	9	Rasmus Lindkvist	2	1	0	0	3
6	DF	(Sweden)	24	Robin Jansson	2	0	1	0	3
9	MF	(Sweden)	16	Sebastian Larsson	2	0	0	0	2
9	MF	(Iraq)	19	Ahmed Yasin	1	1	0	0	2
9	FW	(Sweden)	11	Stefan Silva	1	1	0	0	2
9	DF	(Sweden)	21	Daniel Sundgren	1	0	0	1	2
13	DF	(Sweden)	15	Robert Lundström	1	0	0	0	1
13	MF	(Sweden)	14	Heradi Rashidi	1	0	0	0	1
13	MF	(Sweden)	25	Panajotis Dimitriadis	1	0	0	0	1
13	DF	(Sweden)	6	Alexander Milošević	0	0	1	0	1
13				Own goal	1	0	0	0	1
TOTALS					50	9	2	2	63

=== Clean sheets ===
Place	Position	Nation	Number	Name	Allsvenskan	2017–18 Svenska Cupen	2018–19 Svenska Cupen	UEFA Europa League	Total
1	GK	(Sweden)	34	Oscar Linnér	13	1	0	1	15
2	GK	(Serbia)	23	Budimir Janošević	5	0	1	0	6
TOTALS					18	1	1	1	21

=== Disciplinary record ===
Number	Nation	Position	Name	Allsvenskan		2017–18 Svenska Cupen		2018–19 Svenska Cupen		UEFA Europa League		Total	
Number	Nation	Position	Name	Yellow card	Red card	Yellow card	Red card	Yellow card	Red card	Yellow card	Red card	Yellow card	Red card
2	(Iceland)	DF	Haukur Hauksson	0	0	2	0	0	0	0	0	2	0
3	(Sweden)	DF	Per Karlsson	2	0	0	0	0	0	0	0	2	0
6	(Sweden)	DF	Alexander Milošević	7	0	0	0	0	0	0	0	7	0
7	(Sweden)	MF	Kristoffer Olsson	3	0	2	0	0	0	1	0	6	0
8	(Ghana)	MF	Enoch Adu	3	1	3	0	0	0	0	0	6	1
9	(Sweden)	DF	Rasmus Lindkvist	2	0	0	0	0	0	0	0	2	0
10	(Sweden)	FW	Denni Avdić	1	0	0	0	0	0	0	0	1	0
11	(Sweden)	FW	Stefan Silva	0	0	1	0	0	0	0	0	1	0
14	(Sweden)	MF	Heradi Rashidi	2	1	0	0	0	0	0	0	2	1
15	(Sweden)	DF	Robert Lundström	2	0	0	0	0	0	0	0	2	0
16	(Sweden)	MF	Sebastian Larsson	4	1	0	0	0	0	1	0	5	1
20	(Norway)	MF	Tarik Elyounoussi	3	0	1	0	0	0	1	0	5	0
21	(Sweden)	DF	Daniel Sundgren	6	0	0	0	0	0	2	0	8	0
22	(Argentina)	FW	Nicolás Stefanelli	3	1	0	0	0	0	0	0	3	1
23	(Serbia)	GK	Budimir Janošević	1	0	0	0	0	0	0	0	1	0
24	(Sweden)	DF	Robin Jansson	4	0	0	0	0	0	1	0	5	0
25	(Sweden)	MF	Panajotis Dimitriadis	1	0	0	0	0	0	0	0	1	0
34	(Sweden)	GK	Oscar Linnér	1	0	0	0	0	0	0	0	1	0
36	(Eritrea)	FW	Henok Goitom	2	0	0	0	0	0	1	0	3	0
Players away on loan:
Players who left AIK during the season:
16	(Sweden)	MF	Anton Salétros	1	0	0	0	0	0	0	0	1	0
17	(Sweden)	MF	Nabil Bahoui	3	0	0	0	0	0	0	0	3	0
19	(Iraq)	MF	Ahmed Yasin	1	0	0	0	0	0	0	0	1	0
Total				52	4	9	0	0	0	7	0	68	4
