= Agustin Gómez (footballer, born 1996) =

Argentine footballer

Personal information
- Date of birth: 28 August 1996 (age 30)
- Place of birth: Argentina
- Height: 1.87 m (6 ft 1 1/2 in)
- Position: Centre-back

Team information
- Current team: Deportivo Garcilaso

Youth career
- Racing Club
- Quilmes
- Defensa y Justicia

Senior career*
Years	Team	Apps	(Gls)
2017–2018	Defensa y Justicia	0	(0)
2017	→ AIK (loan)	0	(0)
2018–2019	Fénix	19	(0)
2019–2020	Defensores Unidos	23	(0)
2021–2022	Instituto	24	(0)
2022–2024	Deportivo Morón	67	(3)
2025–	Deportivo Cuenca	36	(3)
2025–	Deportivo Garcilaso	0	(0)
- * Club domestic league appearances and goals as of 24 December 2025

Agustin Gómez (born 28 August 1996) is an Argentine professional footballer who plays as a centre-back for Deportivo Garcilaso.

== Career ==
Gómez spent time in the ranks of Racing Club and Quilmes, prior to joining Defensa y Justicia. On 26 July 2017, Gómez joined Allsvenskan side AIK on loan until December 2017. He made his senior debut on 23 August 2017 during a Svenska Cupen victory away to Värmbols. He returned to Defensa y Justicia in 2018 after no league appearances for AIK, though he was an unused substitute eight times. On 30 June 2018, Fénix of Primera B Metropolitana signed Gómez. After debuting against Almirante Brown on 10 September, the centre-back made nineteen appearances for El Blanquinegro as they finished twelfth in 2018–19.

Gómez spent the 2019–20 campaign with fellow third tier team Defensores Unidos. His first appearance came in a 1–0 win away from home against Deportivo Armenio on 4 August 2019, as he replaced Mateo Escobar in stoppage time at Estadio Armenia. On 2 March 2021, Gómez was announced as a new signing by Primera Nacional outfit Instituto.

In December 2025, Gómez joined Peruvian Liga I club Deportivo Garcilaso.

== Career statistics ==
As of 11 March 2021.

Club statistics
Club	Season	League			Cup		League Cup		Continental		Other		Total	
Club	Season	Division	Apps	Goals	Apps	Goals	Apps	Goals	Apps	Goals	Apps	Goals	Apps	Goals
Defensa y Justicia	2017–18	Primera División	0	0	0	0	—		0	0	0	0	0	0
AIK (loan)	2017	Allsvenskan	0	0	1	0	—		0	0	0	0	1	0
Fénix	2018–19	Primera B Metropolitana	19	0	0	0	—		—		0	0	19	0
Defensores Unidos	2019–20	Primera B Metropolitana	23	0	0	0	—		—		0	0	23	0
Instituto	2021	Primera Nacional	0	0	0	0	—		—		0	0	0	0
Career total			42	0	1	0	—		0	0	0	0	43	0
