= Rasmus Lindkvist =

Swedish footballer

Personal information
- Full name: Per Rasmus Lindkvist
- Date of birth: 16 May 1990 (age 36)
- Place of birth: Stockholm, Sweden
- Height: 1.83 m (6 ft 0 in)
- Positions: Left back; left winger; left wing back

Team information
- Current team: Vasalunds IF

Youth career
- Alby IF
- IF Brommapojkarna
- –2009: Djurgårdens IF

Senior career*
Years	Team	Apps	(Gls)
2009	Djurgårdens IF	0	(0)
2009	→ Skellefteå FF (loan)	18	(0)
2010–2012	Dalkurd FF	69	(7)
2013	Östersunds FK	27	(3)
2014–2017	Vålerenga	78	(10)
2017–2020	AIK	69	(7)
2021	HamKam	25	(2)
2022–2023	GIF Sundsvall	46	(0)
2024	Ariana	24	(0)
2025	IFK Haninge	11	(0)
2025–	Vasalunds IF	0	(0)

International career^{‡}
2018	Sweden	1	(0)
- * Club domestic league appearances and goals as of 24 November 2025 ‡ National team caps and goals as of 11 January 2018

Rasmus Lindkvist (born 16 May 1990) is a Swedish footballer who plays professionally for Ettan Norra club Vasalunds IF as a wing back.

== Club career ==
On 7 January 2022, Lindkvist returned to Sweden and signed a two-year deal with GIF Sundsvall.

== Career statistics ==
As of match played 6 November 2021

Club statistics
Club	Season	League			Cup		Continental		Total	
Club	Season	Division	Apps	Goals	Apps	Goals	Apps	Goals	Apps	Goals
Dalkurd	2010	Division 1	8	4	1	0	—		9	4
Dalkurd	2011	Division 1	25	0	0	0	—		25	0
Dalkurd	2012	Division 1	24	3	0	0	—		24	3
Dalkurd	Total		57	7	1	0	0	0	58	7
Östersund	2013	Superettan	27	3	1	0	—		28	3
Vålerenga	2014	Eliteserien	22	4	2	0	—		24	4
Vålerenga	2015	Eliteserien	23	3	0	0	—		23	3
Vålerenga	2016	Eliteserien	27	3	2	0	—		29	3
Vålerenga	2017	Eliteserien	6	0	0	0	—		6	0
Vålerenga	Total		78	10	4	0	0	0	82	10
AIK	2017	Allsvenskan	16	4	1	0	2 (Note: Appearances in the UEFA Europa League)	0	19	4
AIK	2018	Allsvenskan	25	2	6	1	2	0	33	3
AIK	2019	Allsvenskan	18	1	5	0	6	0	29	1
AIK	2020	Allsvenskan	10	0	4	0	—		14	0
AIK	Total		68	7	16	1	10	0	94	8
HamKam	2021	1. divisjon	23	2	3	1	—		26	3
HamKam	Total		23	2	3	1	0	0	26	3
Career totals			254	29	25	2	10	0	288	31

== Honours ==
AIK

- Allsvenskan: 2018
