= Kristoffer Olsson =

Swedish footballer (born 1995)

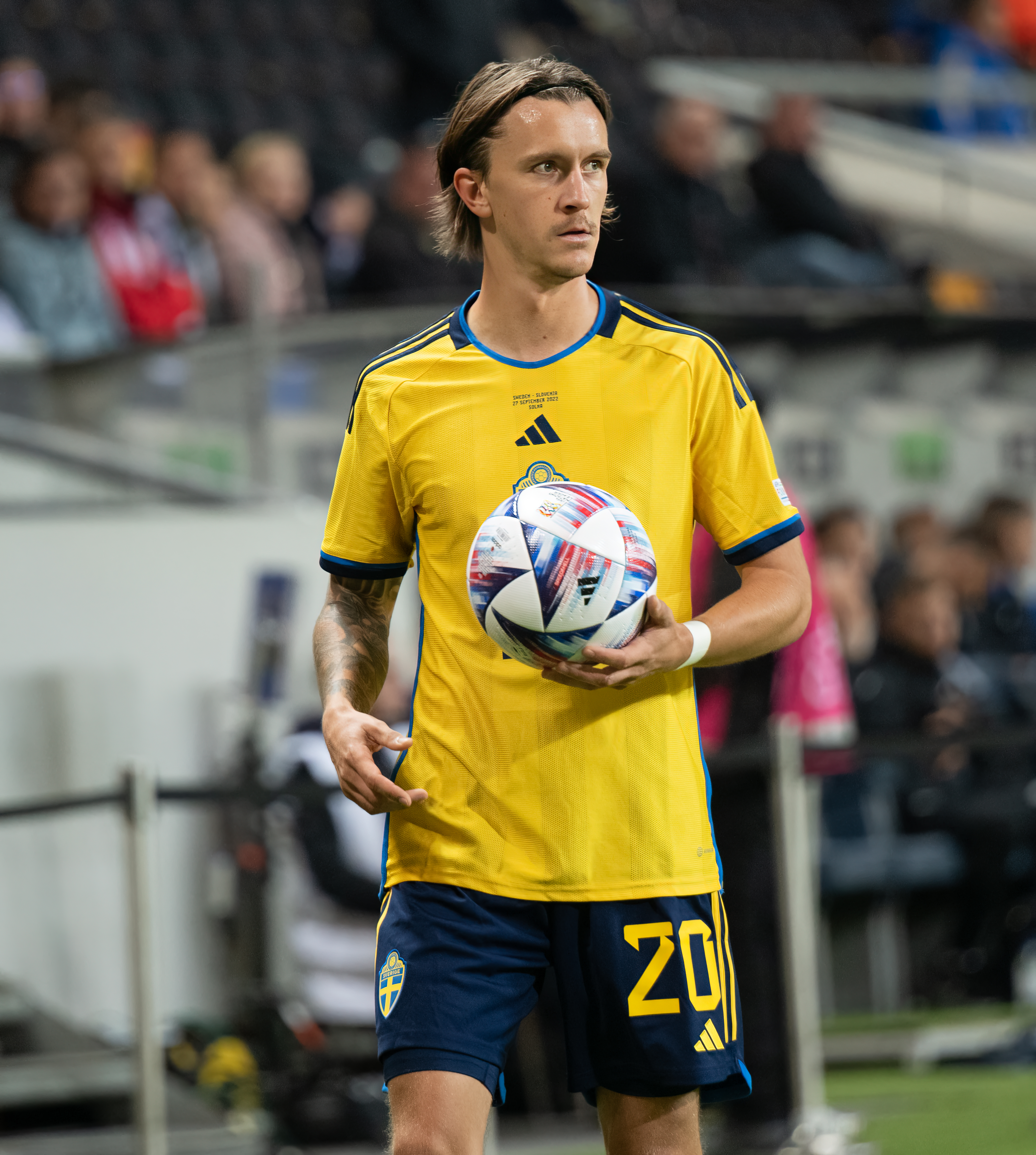
- Olsson with Sweden in 2022

Personal information
- Full name: Mats Kristoffer Olsson
- Date of birth: 30 June 1995 (age 31)
- Place of birth: Norrköping, Sweden
- Height: 1.78 m (5 ft 10 in)
- Position: Midfielder

Team information
- Current team: IK Sleipner
- Number: 20

Youth career
- –2005: IK Sleipner
- 2005–2011: IFK Norrköping
- 2011–2013: Arsenal

Senior career*
Years	Team	Apps	(Gls)
2013–2014	Arsenal	0	(0)
2014	→ Midtjylland (loan)	6	(0)
2015–2017	Midtjylland	44	(2)
2017–2018	AIK	58	(7)
2019–2021	Krasnodar	59	(4)
2021–2023	Anderlecht	36	(0)
2022–2023	→ Midtjylland (loan)	23	(5)
2023–2025	Midtjylland	13	(0)
2025–	IK Sleipner	23	(0)

International career^{‡}
2010–2012	Sweden U17	19	(3)
2012–2014	Sweden U19	15	(2)
2014–2017	Sweden U21	27	(6)
2017–2023	Sweden	47	(0)
Medal record
Men's football
Representing Sweden
UEFA European Under-21 Championship
Winner	2015 Czech Republic
- * Club domestic league appearances and goals as of 22:26, 28 October 2026 (UTC+1) ‡ National team caps and goals as of 17:05, 20 November 2023 (UTC)

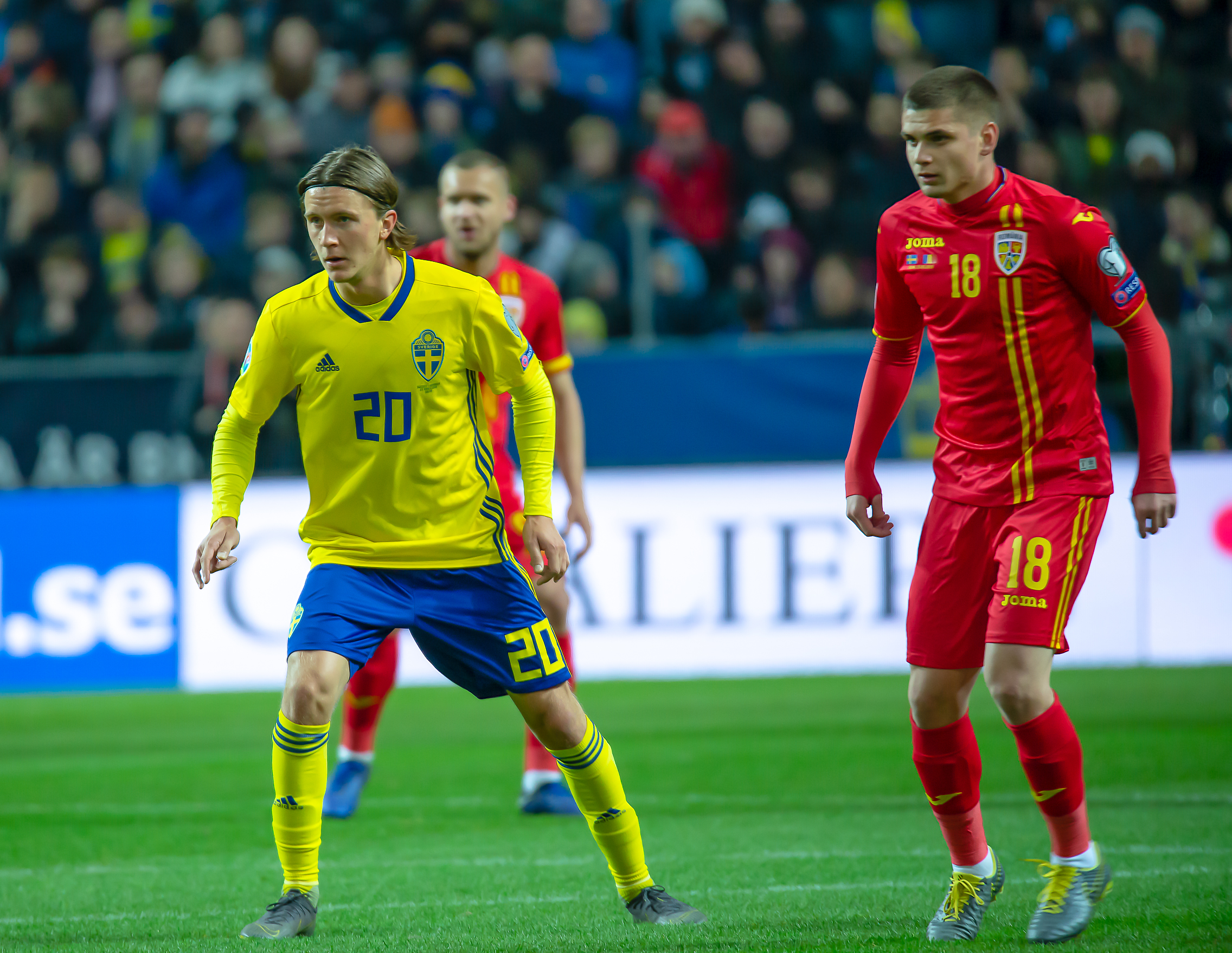
Olsson against Romania in 2019

Mats Kristoffer Olsson (born 30 June 1995) is a Swedish professional footballer who plays as a midfielder for IK Sleipner. A full international between 2017 and 2023, Olsson won 47 caps for the Sweden national team and represented his country at the UEFA Euro 2020.

== Club career ==
=== Early career ===
Born in Norrköping in Sweden, Olsson started his career at IK Sleipner. When he was 13, Olsson was offered a trial at English club Chelsea, however he didn't attend and subsequently moved to IFK Norrköping. When he was 16, Olsson garnered interest by European clubs such as Juventus and Ajax, as well as domestically from IFK Göteborg. However, he signed for Arsenal in 2011 for £200,000 after having spent two previous trial periods with Arsenal. While on trial at Arsenal, he played for Arsenal's under-16s against Crystal Palace and was invited to take part in the Ferrolli Cup and the Nike Cup as a result of his performances. Olsson revealed that it was the drive of Arsenal Academy manager, Liam Brady, who persuaded Arsène Wenger to sign him, that persuaded Olsson himself to sign for Arsenal.

=== Arsenal ===
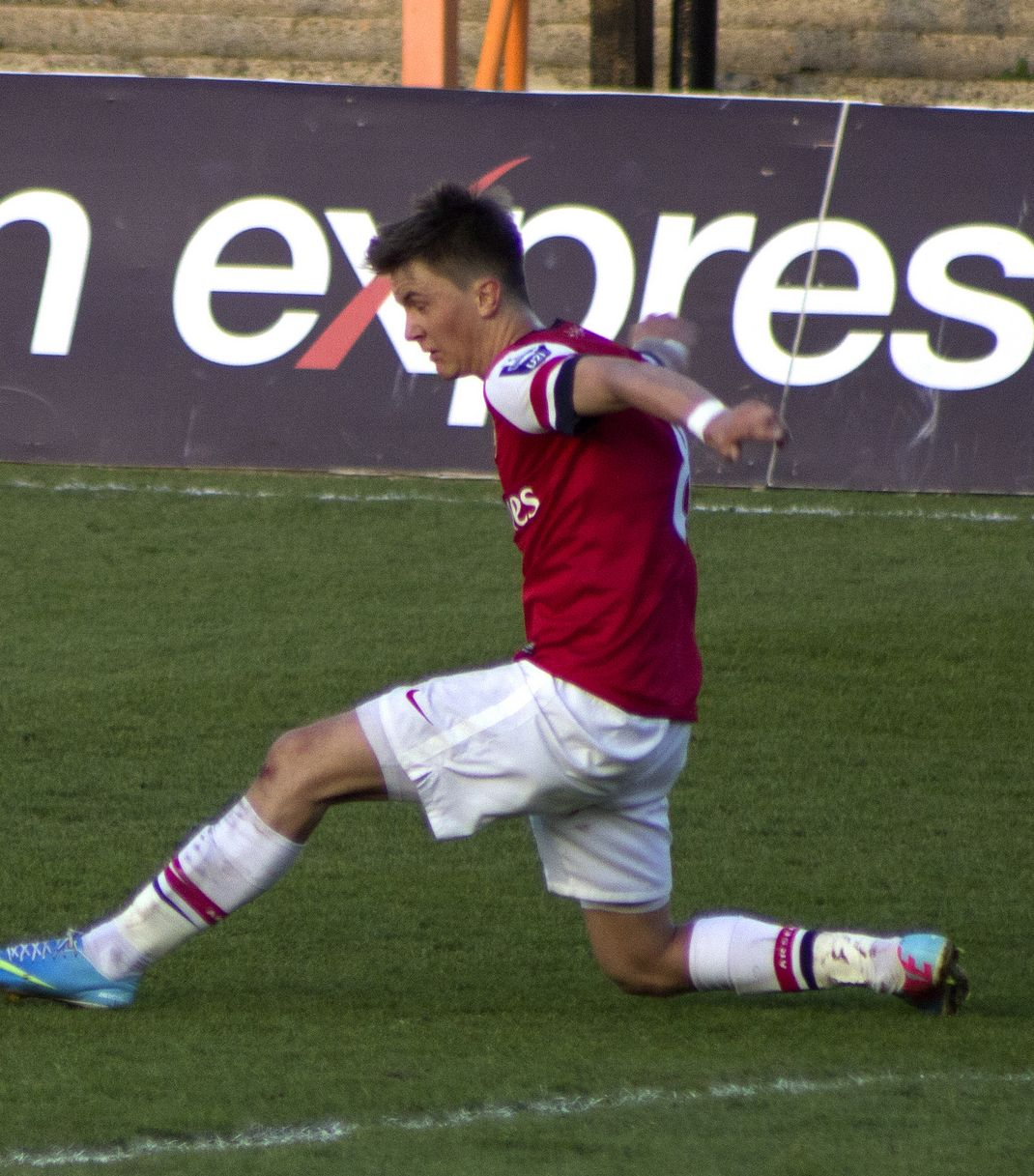
Olsson featuring for Arsenal in 2012

Olsson first played for Arsenal during their 2013 pre-season tour of the Far East. He scored his first goal for Arsenal against the Indonesia national team at Gelora Bung Karno Stadium, Jakarta following a cross from Tomáš Rosický. Olsson made his full competitive debut for Arsenal on 25 September 2013 as an 84th-minute substitute for Isaac Hayden in a League Cup game against West Bromwich Albion, in which he scored a penalty kick where Arsenal came out winners and proceeded to the next round.

=== FC Midtjylland ===
On 2 September 2014, Arsenal announced that Olsson moved to FC Midtjylland in Denmark on loan until the end of 2014. He made his debut for the club in a 3–2 home win against OB Odense, coming on for Pione Sisto in the 78th minute. On 27 December 2014, the Danish club announced that a permanent deal had been agreed with Arsenal to make Olsson's loan move permanent, with the player himself signing a new three-and-a-half-year contract.

=== AIK ===
On 31 January 2017, Olsson signed for Allsvenskan club AIK.

=== Krasnodar ===
On 7 January 2019, it was announced that Olsson had signed a contract with FC Krasnodar of the Russian Premier League.

=== Anderlecht ===
On 21 July 2021, he signed a four-year contract with Belgian club Anderlecht.

=== Return to FC Midtjylland ===
On 31 August 2022, Olsson returned to his former club FC Midtjylland on a season-long loan deal with a purchase option. In July 2023, he completed a permanent move to the club.

== International career ==
Olsson has represented Sweden at various youth levels and his style of play has been compared to former Swedish Arsenal players such as Freddie Ljungberg and Sebastian Larsson. In January 2015 he received his first call up to the senior Sweden squad for friendlies against Ivory Coast and Finland. However, in his first training session with the team he broke his leg. Olsson was, in May 2017, called up to the Sweden's squad for the 2017 UEFA European Under-21 Championship to be held in Poland.

On 20 November 2018, Olsson played his first competitive match for Sweden against Russia at Friends Arena in Stockholm, in the 2018–19 UEFA Nations League. Olsson started in the midfield and played almost the entire match. It ended as a 2–0 victory for the home side, which earned Sweden promotion to League A in the next edition of the tournament, as well as a play-off spot for UEFA Euro 2020.

He was part of Sweden's squad at UEFA Euro 2020 that reached the round of 16 before being eliminated by Ukraine.

== Personal life ==
In February 2024, Olsson collapsed in his home and was rushed to the Aarhus University Hospital and put on a ventilator. His club, Midtjylland, put out a statement, in which they stated that the illness was related to the brain. They also added that the condition was not related to self-harm or external factors. On 7 March, Midtjylland put out a statement saying that after numerous scans and examinations, doctors diagnosed that the collapse was caused by several small blood clots in both sides of the brain caused by an extremely rare inflammatory condition in the cerebral arteries. On 14 April, the club announced that Olsson had made significant progress, regaining motor control and his ability to speak, while continuing his rehabilitation at Hammel Neurocenter. On 26 May, he surprisingly came onto the pitch after Midtjylland's Superliga title win, and presented the trophy to the team.

== Career statistics ==
=== Club ===
As of match played 4 December 2023

Appearances and goals by club, season and competition
Club	Season	League			National cup (Note: Includes EFL Cup, Danish Cup, Svenska Cupen, Russian Cup, Belgian Cup)		Continental		Total	
Club	Season	Division	Apps	Goals	Apps	Goals	Apps	Goals	Apps	Goals
Arsenal	2013–14	Premier League	0	0	1	0	0	0	1	0
Midtjylland	2014–15	Danish Superliga	10	0	2	0	0	0	12	0
Midtjylland	2015–16	Danish Superliga	27	1	1	0	10 (Note: Two appearances in UEFA Champions League, eight appearances in UEFA Europa League)	0	38	1
Midtjylland	2016–17	Danish Superliga	13	1	1	1	8 (Note: Appearances in UEFA Europa League)	0	22	2
Midtjylland	Total		50	2	4	1	18	0	72	3
AIK	2017	Allsvenskan	29	2	3	0	6	0	38	2
AIK	2018	Allsvenskan	29	5	5	1	4	1	38	7
AIK	Total		58	7	8	1	10	1	76	9
Krasnodar	2018–19	Russian Premier League	6	0	1	0	4	0	11	0
Krasnodar	2019–20	Russian Premier League	27	1	0	0	7 (Note: Two appearances in UEFA Champions League, five appearances in UEFA Europa League)	0	34	1
Krasnodar	2020–21	Russian Premier League	26	3	1	0	8 (Note: Six appearances in UEFA Champions League, two appearances in UEFA Europa League)	0	35	3
Krasnodar	Total		59	4	2	0	19	0	80	4
Anderlecht	2021–22	Belgian Pro League	33	0	5	0	4 (Note: Appearances in UEFA Europa Conference League)	0	42	0
Anderlecht	2022–23	Belgian Pro League	3	0	0	0	3	0	6	0
Anderlecht	Total		36	0	5	0	7	0	48	0
Midtjylland (loan)	2022–23	Danish Superliga	24	5	1	0	7	0	32	5
Midtjylland	2023–24	Danish Superliga	13	0	1	0	6	0	20	0
Midtjylland	Total		37	5	2	0	13	0	52	5
Career total			240	18	22	2	67	1	329	21

=== International ===
As of match played on 19 November 2023.

Appearances and goals by national team and year
National team	Year	Apps	Goals
Sweden	2017	1	0
Sweden	2018	4	0
Sweden	2019	10	0
Sweden	2020	7	0
Sweden	2021	13	0
Sweden	2022	8	0
Sweden	2023	4	0
Total		47	0

== Honours ==
Midtjylland

- Danish Superliga: 2014–15, 2023–24

AIK

- Allsvenskan: 2018

Sweden U21

- UEFA European Under-21 Championship: 2015
