= Stipe Vrdoljak =

Croatian footballer

Personal information
- Full name: Stipe Vrdoljak
- Date of birth: 2 August 1993 (age 33)
- Place of birth: Osijek, Croatia
- Height: 1.84 m (6 ft 1/2 in)
- Position: Left back

Team information
- Current team: Zrinski Jurjevac P.
- Number: 10

Youth career
- 2003–2012: Osijek
- 2012–2015: Novigrad

Senior career*
Years	Team	Apps	(Gls)
2015	Pescara	0	(0)
2016	Hajduk Split	0	(0)
2016–2018	Novigrad	17	(1)
2017	→ AIK (loan)	6	(0)
2017	→ Istra 1961 (loan)	0	(0)
2018–2020	Koper	5	(0)
2020	Aluminij	9	(1)
2021	BSK Bijelo Brdo	15	(1)
2021-	Zrinski Jurjevac P.		
- * Club domestic league appearances and goals as of 15:21, 21 December 2020 (UTC)

Stipe Vrdoljak (born 2 August 1993) is a Croatian professional footballer who plays as a defender for NK Zrinski Jurjevac Punitovački.
