= Budimir Janošević =

Serbian footballer

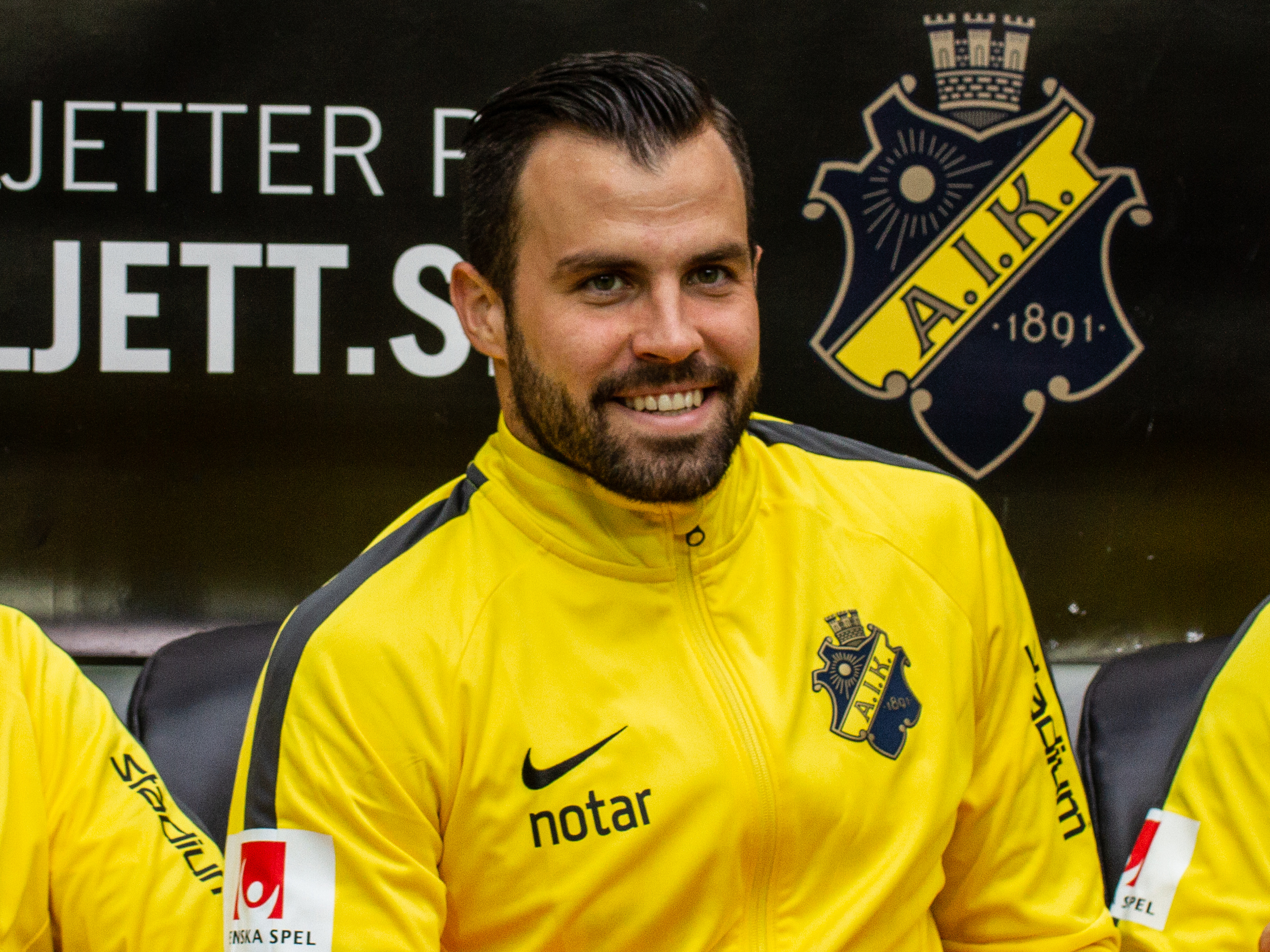

Personal information
- Date of birth: 21 October 1989 (age 37)
- Place of birth: Belgrade, SFR Yugoslavia
- Height: 1.90 m (6 ft 3 in)
- Position: Goalkeeper

Senior career*
Years	Team	Apps	(Gls)
2007–2010	Čukarički	7	(0)
2010–2011	Jagodina	10	(0)
2011–2012	Vojvodina	4	(0)
2012–2013	Rad	0	(0)
2013	Teleoptik	12	(0)
2013–2016	Spartak Subotica	48	(0)
2015	→ Adana Demirspor (loan)	17	(0)
2017	IF Brommapojkarna	16	(0)
2018–2024	AIK	46	(0)

International career
2009	Serbia U21	1	(0)
- * Club domestic league appearances and goals as of 16 November 2024

Budimir Janošević (Serbian Cyrillic: Будимир Јаношевић, Serbian pronunciation: [budimir janǒːʃeʋitɕ]; born 21 October 1989) is a Serbian professional footballer who plays as a goalkeeper.

His only appearance for the Serbian national under-21 team came on 18 November 2009 in a friendly match against Denmark U21.

== Career ==
=== AIK ===
On 22 November 2017, AIK announced the signing of Janošević on a contract until 31 December 2020. On 23 December 2020, AIK announced that they had extended their contract with Janošević until 31 December 2021. A year later, on 30 December 2021, Janošević extended his contract with AIK until 31 December 2022. On 3 January 2023, Janošević extended his contract again with AIK, this time until 31 December 2024.

== Honours ==
IF Brommapojkarna

- Superettan: 2017

AIK

- Allsvenskan: 2018
