= Sean Sabetkar =

Swedish footballer (born 1995)

Personal information
- Full name: Sean Behnam Sabetkar
- Date of birth: 28 April 1995 (age 31)
- Place of birth: Sollentuna, Sweden
- Height: 1.87 m (6 ft 2 in)
- Position: Centre-back

Team information
- Current team: Vasalunds IF

Youth career
- 2001–2011: AIK

Senior career*
Years	Team	Apps	(Gls)
2012–2013	Bollstanäs SK	14	(0)
2014	Vasalunds IF	0	(0)
2015–2016	Karlbergs BK	44	(3)
2017–2018	Sollentuna FK	55	(0)
2019–2021	Västerås SK	53	(2)
2021–2023	Degerfors IF	46	(0)
2023	PT Prachuap	7	(0)
2024–	→ Vasalunds IF	7	(0)
- * Club domestic league appearances and goals as of 1 July 2023

Sean Behnam Sabetkar (Persian: شان ثابتکار; born 28 April 1995) is a Swedish professional footballer who plays as a centre-back for Vasalunds IF.

== Club career ==
Sabetkar made his Allsvenskan debut for Degerfors IF on 12 April 2021 against AIK during the 2021 season.

== Career statistics ==
=== Club ===
As of 24 June 2022

Appearances and goals by club, season and competition
Club	Season	League			Cup		Continental		Total	
Club	Season	Division	Apps	Goals	Apps	Goals	Apps	Goals	Apps	Goals
Bollstanäs SK	2012	Division 3	3	0	0	0	—		3	0
Bollstanäs SK	2013	Division 3	11	0	0	0	—		11	0
Bollstanäs SK	Total		14	0	0	0	—		14	0
Vasalunds IF	2014	Ettan Norra	0	0	0	0	—		0	0
Karlbergs BK	2015	Division 3	21	1	0	0	—		21	1
Karlbergs BK	2016	Division 2	23	2	0	0	—		23	2
Karlbergs BK	Total		44	3	0	0	—		44	3
Sollentuna FK	2017	Ettan Norra	26	0	2	0	—		28	0
Sollentuna FK	2018	Ettan Norra	29	0	1	0	—		30	0
Sollentuna FK	Total		55	0	3	0	—		58	0
Västerås SK	2019	Superettan	25	2	1	0	—		26	2
Västerås SK	2020	Superettan	28	0	3	1	—		31	1
Västerås SK	2021	Superettan	—		4	1	—		4	1
Västerås SK	Total		53	2	8	2	—		61	4
Degerfors IF	2021	Allsvenskan	26	0	0	0	—		26	0
Degerfors IF	2022	Allsvenskan	15	0	2	0	—		11	0
Degerfors IF	Total		41	0	2	0	—		37	0
Career total			207	5	13	2	—		214	7
