= Mateo Escobar =

Argentine footballer

Personal information
- Full name: Mateo Martín Escobar
- Date of birth: 7 November 1995 (age 31)
- Place of birth: Zárate, Argentina
- Height: 1.86 m (6 ft 1 in)
- Position: Forward

Youth career
- Defensores Unidos

Senior career*
| Years | Team | Apps | (Gls) |
| 2016–2020 | Defensores Unidos | 152 | (34) |
| 2020–2022 | Almirante Brown | 10 | (5) |
| 2023 | Guanacasteca | 8 | (1) |
- * Club domestic league appearances and goals as of 00:32, 18 June 2024 (UTC)

Mateo Martín Escobar (born 7 November 1995) is an Argentine professional footballer who plays as a forward.

== Career ==
Escobar started his career in the ranks of Defensores Unidos. After appearing for his senior debut in 2016 in Primera C Metropolitana, the forward went on to score fourteen goals in fifty-seven appearances in all competitions across two seasons as they gained promotion to Primera B Metropolitana in 2017–18. He made his bow in the second tier on 16 September 2018 during a defeat to Fénix. His first goals at that level came in March 2019 against Almirante Brown and Colegiales. He scored three more goals across the next twelve months, prior to departing to join the aforementioned Almirante Brown in September 2020.

In January 2023, Escobar signed for Liga FPD club Guanacasteca.

== Personal life ==
At a young age, Escobar regularly took part in athletics; including the 100m, winning races at the Buenos Aires Games and training at CeNARD. He decided to focus on football after leaving school.

== Career statistics ==
As of 12 October 2020.

Appearances and goals by club, season and competition
| Club | Season | League | | | Cup | | League Cup | | Continental | | Other | | Total | | | | | | | | |
| Club | Season | Division | Apps | Goals | Apps | Goals | Apps | Goals | Apps | Goals | Apps | Goals | Apps | Goals | | | | | | | |
|---|---|---|---|---|---|---|---|---|---|---|---|---|---|---|---|---|---|---|---|---|---|
| Defensores Unidos | 2018–19 | Primera B Metropolitana | 31 | 21 | 5 | 0 | — | | | | | | | | | | — | 0 | 0 | 33 | 3 |
| Defensores Unidos | 2018–19 | Primera B Metropolitana | 20 | 2 | 1 | 0 | — | | — | | 0 | 0 | 21 | 7 | | | | | | | |
| Defensores Unidos | Total | Primera B Metropolitana | 51 | 5 | 3 | 0 | — | | — | | 0 | 0 | 54 | 5 | | | | | | | |
| Defensores Unidos | Almirante Brown | Primera B Metropolitana | 2020–21 | Primera B Metropolitana | 0 | 0 | 0 | 0 | — | | — | | 0 | 0 | 0 | 0 | | | | | |
| Defensores Unidos | Career total | Primera B Metropolitana | | 51 | 5 | 3 | 0 | — | | — | | 0 | 0 | 54 | | | | | | | |

== Honours ==
Almirante Brown
Defensores Unidos

- Primera B Metropolitana: 2020
- Primera C Metropolitana: 2017–18
