= Alexander Ekblad =

Swedish footballer

Personal information
- Full name: Hans Alexander Ekblad
- Date of birth: 7 August 1987 (age 39)
- Place of birth: Borlänge, Sweden
- Height: 1.85 m (6 ft 1 in)
- Position: Defender

Senior career*
Years	Team	Apps	(Gls)
2004–2007	IK Brage	1	(0)
2008–2019	Dalkurd FF	168	(6)
2019–2020	IK Brage	30	(0)
- * Club domestic league appearances and goals

Hans Alexander Ekblad (born 7 August 1987) is a Swedish former footballer.
