= Marcus Johansson (footballer, born 1993) =

Swedish footballer

Personal information
- Full name: Marcus Johansson
- Date of birth: 24 August 1993 (age 33)
- Place of birth: Sweden
- Height: 1.95 m (6 ft 5 in)
- Position: Centre back

Team information
- Current team: ÍA
- Number: 93

Youth career
- –2012: Halmstads BK

Senior career*
Years	Team	Apps	(Gls)
2013–2017	Halmstads BK	43	(1)
2015	→ Östers IF (loan)	2	(0)
2018	Jönköpings Södra IF	8	(0)
2018	Silkeborg IF	0	(0)
2019–	ÍA	6	(0)
- * Club domestic league appearances and goals as of 17:32, 31 May 2019 (UTC)

Marcus Johansson (born 24 August 1993) is a Swedish footballer who currently plays for ÍA in Iceland.

== Career ==
=== Silkeborg IF ===
Johansson left Silkeborg IF at the end of 2018.
