= Stefan Silva =

Swedish footballer of Chilean descent (born 1990)

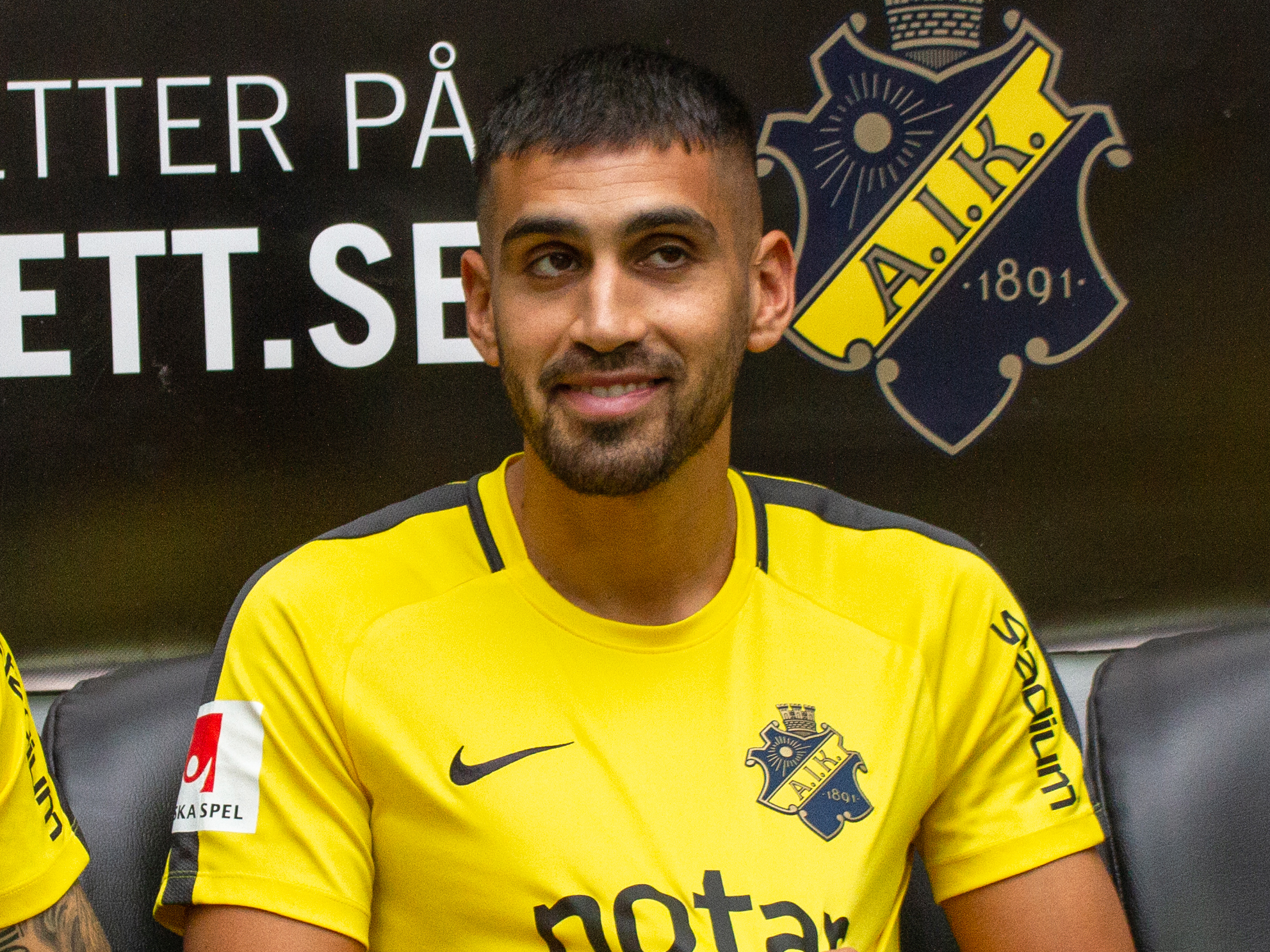

Personal information
- Full name: Maximiliano Stefan Silva Rojas
- Date of birth: 11 March 1990 (age 36)
- Place of birth: Stockholm, Sweden
- Height: 1.81 m (5 ft 11 in)
- Position: Forward

Youth career
- Brommapojkarna

Senior career*
Years	Team	Apps	(Gls)
2009–2013	Akropolis	74	(14)
2013–2015	IK Sirius	69	(30)
2016	GIF Sundsvall	30	(7)
2017	Palermo	1	(0)
2018–2021	AIK	27	(1)
2019	→ Fatih Karagümrük (loan)	5	(0)
- * Club domestic league appearances and goals as of 24 October 2021

Maximiliano Stefan Silva Rojas (born 11 March 1990), known as Stefan Silva, is a Swedish-Chilean professional footballer who plays as a forward.

== Career ==
A Chilean Swede, Silva was born and grew up in Rissne, Sundbyberg, northwestern Stockholm, and made his first-team debut in 2009 at Akropolis, a Stockholm-based club founded by Greek emigrants. In 2013, he moved to IK Sirius, then in the third tier, with whom he won promotion to Superettan on his first season, and missed out a second consecutive promotion on playoffs on the following one.

In 2016, Silva signed a two-year deal with Allsvenskan club GIF Sundsvall, thus making his top flight debut. This came on 3 April 2016 in a 1-1 draw with AIK. His first goal for Sundsvall came on 7 April 2016 in a 2-1 loss to Gefle. His goal, assisted by Eric Larsson, came in the 8th minute.

On 9 January 2017, Serie A club Palermo confirmed to have signed Silva on a deal set to expire on 30 June 2021. He made his league debut on 5 February 2017 in a 1-0 win against Crotone. He came on for Aleksandar Trajkovski in the 74th minute. This was the only league appearance he made for Palermo. The contract was terminated by mutual consent 15 December 2017.

On 9 January 2018, AIK announced they had signed Silva on a contract that expires 31 December 2020. Silva made his first league appearance and goal on 22 April 2018 against IFK Göteborg.

== Personal life ==
Silva holds the Chilean nationality by descent since his parents are Chilean. His family is from Valparaíso and his uncles were footballers for Santiago Wanderers in Chile. At least, he has traveled to Chile three times until he was 21 years old.

== Honours ==
AIK

- Allsvenskan: 2018
