= Jesper Nyholm =

Filipino footballer

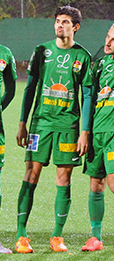
- Nyholm playing for Dalkurd in 2015

Personal information
- Full name: Jesper Gunnar Fernando Nyholm
- Date of birth: September 10, 1993 (age 33)
- Place of birth: Uppsala, Sweden
- Height: 1.83 m (6 ft 0 in)
- Position: Center back

Team information
- Current team: PT Prachuap
- Number: 15

Youth career
- –2011: Funbo IF

Senior career*
Years	Team	Apps	(Gls)
2011–2013	IK Sirius	4	(0)
2013	→ Gamla Upsala SK (loan)	16	(0)
2014	Gamla Upsala SK	19	(1)
2015–2016	Dalkurd	54	(2)
2017–2019	AIK	22	(1)
2020–2021	Djurgården	21	(1)
2022–2023	Muangthong United	34	(1)
2023–2024	Perak	29	(0)
2024–	PT Prachuap	13	(1)

International career^{‡}
2021–	Philippines	9	(1)
- * Club domestic league appearances and goals as of 25 December 2024 ‡ National team caps and goals as of 15:10; 25 March 2025 (UTC)

Jesper Gunnar Fernando Nyholm (born September 10, 1993) is a professional footballer who plays as a center back for Thai League 1 club PT Prachuap. Born in Sweden, he plays for the Philippines national team.

== International career ==
Born in Sweden, Nyholm is of Filipino descent through his mother. In early March 2017, he was contacted by the Philippine Football Federation regarding playing for the Philippines national team. A month later, Nyholm revealed that upon speaking with his club coach Rikard Norling, he was told that he had great potential and should wait for the possibility to play for the Sweden national team.

He was called up to the Philippines in May 2021. He scored on his debut against Timor-Leste in their 7–0 win.

== Career statistics ==
=== Club ===
As of match played 14 May 2017

Appearances and goals by club, season and competition
Club	Season	League			Cup		Continental		Total	
Club	Season	Division	Apps	Goals	Apps	Goals	Apps	Goals	Apps	Goals
Sirius	2011	Division 1	2	0	0	0	—		2	0
Sirius	2012	Division 1	2	0	1	0	—		3	0
Sirius	Total		4	0	1	0	—		5	0
Gamla Upsala	2013	Division 2	16	0	0	0	—		16	0
Gamla Upsala	2014	Division 2	19	1	0	0	—		19	1
Gamla Upsala	Total		35	1	0	0	—		35	1
Dalkurd	2015	Division 1	25	1	2	0	—		27	1
Dalkurd	2016	Superettan	29	1	0	0	—		29	1
Dalkurd	Total		54	2	2	0	—		56	2
AIK	2017	Allsvenskan	7	1	0	0	0	0	7	1
Career total			100	4	3	0	0	0	103	4

=== International ===
International goals

No	Date	Venue	Opponent	Score	Result	Competition
1.	11 December 2021	National Stadium, Kallang, Singapore	Timor-Leste	5–0	7–0	2020 AFF Championship
