= Rickson Mansiamina =

Swedish footballer

Personal information
- Full name: Luyindula Rickson Mansiamina
- Date of birth: 9 July 1997 (age 29)
- Place of birth: Stockholm, Sweden
- Height: 1.72 m (5 ft 8 in)
- Position: Midfielder

Team information
- Current team: Täby FK
- Number: 22

Youth career
- Enskede IK
- Bagarmossen Kärrtorp BK
- –2011: Hammarby IF
- 2011–2016: AIK

Senior career*
Years	Team	Apps	(Gls)
2016–2018	AIK	0	(0)
2016	→ HIFK (loan)	9	(0)
2017	→ GAIS (loan)	7	(0)
2017	→ Syrianska (loan)	8	(0)
2018	→ Vasalund (loan)	17	(0)
2019	Enskede IK	8	(2)
2019	IFK Haninge	7	(3)
2020	Karlslunds IF FK	16	(2)
2021–2022	IFK Haninge	41	(7)
2023–	Täby FK	9	(0)
- * Club domestic league appearances and goals as of 29 November 2023

Luyindula Rickson Mansiamina (born 9 July 1997 in Bredäng) is a Swedish footballer who plays as a midfielder for Täby FK.

== Career ==
He played for three Stockholm clubs in his youth; Enskede IK, Bagarmossen Kärrtorp BK and Hammarby IF, before joining AIK's youth academy in 2011. In 2016, he went on loan to IFK Helsingfors and played nine league games in the Veikkausliiga.

In August 2019, Mansiamina joined IFK Haninge.
