= Daniel Mushitu =

Swedish footballer (born 2000)

Personal information
- Full name: Daniel Mushitu Mwinkeu
- Date of birth: 22 February 2000 (age 26)
- Place of birth: Kolwezi, DR Congo
- Height: 1.84 m (6 ft 0 in)
- Position: Forward

Team information
- Current team: Örebro Syrianska
- Number: 7

Youth career
- Ludvika FK
- Nyhammars IF
- 2013: Skiljebo SK
- 2014: Syrianska
- 2016–2017: AIK

Senior career*
Years	Team	Apps	(Gls)
2014	Syrianska		
2015–2016	Västerås IK	29	(0)
2017–2020	AIK	3	(0)
2018	→ Vasalund IF (loan)	6	(0)
2019	→ Vasalund IF (loan)	12	(0)
2020	→ IF Karlstad (loan)	21	(1)
2021	Örebro Syrianska	5	(1)
2022	Karlslunds IF	19	(4)
2023–	Örebro Syrianska	14	(3)

International career^{‡}
2017	Sweden U-17	3	(0)
- * Club domestic league appearances and goals as of 7 August 2023 ‡ National team caps and goals as of 17 April 2019

Daniel Mushitu Mwinkeu (born 22 February 2000) is a Swedish footballer who plays as a forward for Örebro Syrianska.

== Youth career ==
Mushitu started playing for Ludvika FK before joining Nyhammars IF. He then joined Skiljebo SK before he continued to Syrianska IF Kerburan in 2014.

== Career ==
=== Syrianska IF ===
After joining the club in 2014, he already got his first team debut at the age of 14 on 26 June 2014, coming in from the bench in the 89th minute against Strömsbergs IF

=== Västerås IK ===
In 2015, he then joined Västerås IK where he played on the first team. His debut for the club took place on April 18, 2015, at home against Kvarnsvedens IK (1-1) in the second round of Division 2 Norra Svealand. He played 18 games in the first season of which 15 from the start, ant the club finished in ninth place in the table. In 2016, he played 11 games, of which nine from the start.

=== AIK ===
On 11 July 2016, Mushito joined AIK. During his first half year at the club, he played seven games and scored three goals in the U-17 Allsvenskan Norra. He also played two games in the U-19 Allsvenskan Norra. In the autumn 2016, Mushitu was also selected for AIK's reported squad for the UEFA Youth League, without playing any games. During the pre-season 2017, Daniel trained with the A-squad and he also participated in the training camp in Dubai. On January 21, 2017, Mushitu made his debut for AIK's A team when he came in from the bench in the friendly against Vasalund IF (4-0) replacing Denni Avdić in the second half and in the 48th, he made an assist to the 3-0 goal.

In March 2017, Mushito was permanently promoted to the first team squad, signing a new professional contract. Earlier in March 2017, Mushito had got his official debut for the club against Dalkurd FF in the Svenska Cupen. On 29 May 2017, Mushito got his Allsvenskan debut, becoming the first ever player for AIK from year 2000 to be in the starting lineup. He played five games for AIK in the 2017.

==== Loan to Vasalunds ====
Mushitu started the 2018 season with Vasalund IF as a part of a development cooperation between AIK and Vasalunds. However, it was announced on 15 February, that he would join the club on loan. Mushito played nine games for the first team, and five for the U-19. He returned to AIK on 14 July 2018.

==== Loan to Vasalunds again ====
On 16 January 2019, Mushito was once again loaned out to Vasalund IF until 1 December 2019.
