= Christos Gravius =

Swedish Greece footballer

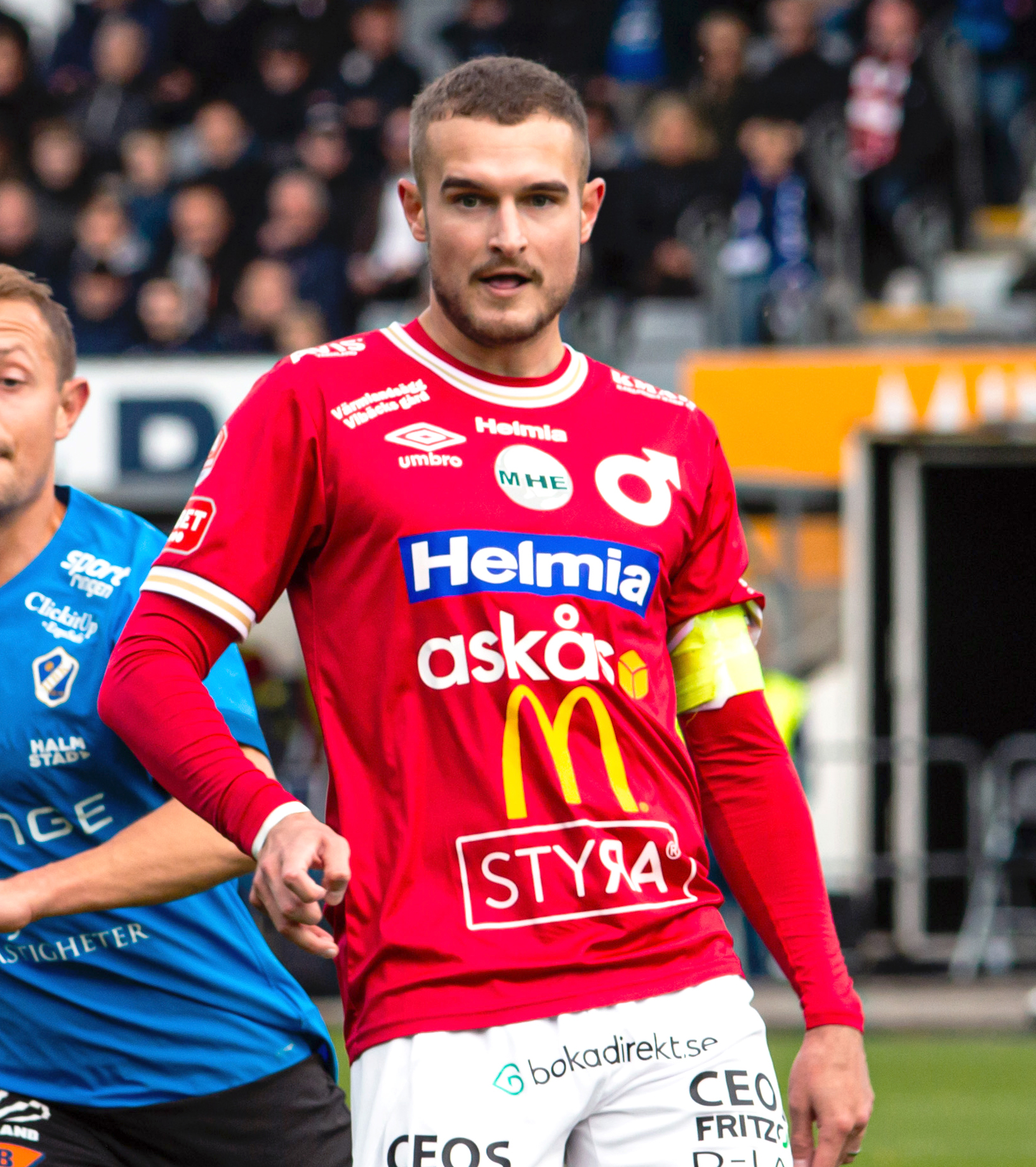

Personal information
- Full name: Christos Emil Gravius
- Date of birth: 14 October 1997 (age 29)
- Place of birth: Solna, Sweden
- Height: 1.78 m (5 ft 10 in)
- Position: Midfielder

Team information
- Current team: GAIS
- Number: 11

Youth career
- –2007: IFK Viksjö
- 2007–2014: AIK

Senior career*
Years	Team	Apps	(Gls)
2015–2019	AIK	10	(0)
2015	→ Vasalunds IF (loan)	1	(0)
2017	→ Jönköpings Södra IF (loan)	9	(0)
2018	→ Degerfors IF (loan)	29	(0)
2019	→ Degerfors IF (loan)	27	(0)
2020–2023	Degerfors IF	105	(4)
2024	Athens Kallithea	0	(0)
2024–	Degerfors IF	34	(0)

International career
2014	Sweden U17	2	(0)
2014–2016	Sweden U19	5	(0)
- * Club domestic league appearances and goals as of 4 November 2025

Christos Gravius (born 14 October 1997) (Greek: Χρήστος Γκράβιους) is a Swedish professional footballer who plays as a midfielder for GAIS.

== Club career ==
=== AIK ===
Gravius came through the academy at AIK and made his first-team debut for the club at age 17 in an Allsvenskan match against GIF Sundsvall in July 2015. In the 2016 season, Gravius would make 15 total appearances across all competitions, including nine appearances in the league and two appearances in UEFA Europa League qualification.

Gravius would spend the next three seasons out on loan, first to Jönköpings in the top division followed by two seasons at Degerfors in the second division, where he became a mainstay in midfield.

=== Degerfors ===
In the 2020 season, Gravius made a permanent move to Degerfors, and he would immediately help the club win promotion, returning to the top flight for the first time in 24 years.

Gravius made 77 total appearances (all starts) for Degerfors in the Swedish top division over the 2021, 2022, and 2023 seasons, until his contract expired in December 2023.

=== Athens Kallithea FC ===
In January 2024, Gravius joined Athens Kallithea FC in Super League 2.

== International career ==
In international play, Gravius represented Sweden at the Under-17, Under-18, and Under-19 levels.

== Personal life ==
Born in Sweden, Gravius is of Greek descent.
