= Haukur Heiðar Hauksson =

Icelandic footballer

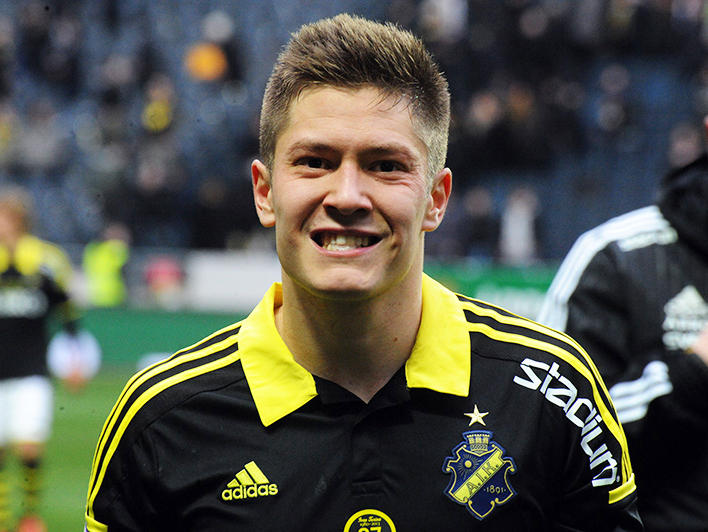

Personal information
- Full name: Haukur Heiðar Hauksson
- Date of birth: 1 September 1991 (age 35)
- Place of birth: Akureyri, Iceland
- Height: 1.86 m (6 ft 1 in)
- Position: Right back

Youth career
- KA

Senior career*
Years	Team	Apps	(Gls)
2008–2011	KA	80	(7)
2012–2014	KR	52	(3)
2015–2018	AIK	57	(7)
2019–2021	KA	20	(0)
Total		209	(17)

International career^{‡}
2008–2009	Iceland U19	7	(0)
2012	Iceland U21	1	(0)
2015–2021	Iceland	7	(0)
- * Club domestic league appearances and goals as of 15 July 2021 ‡ National team caps and goals as of 6 June 2016

Haukur Heiðar Hauksson (Icelandic pronunciation: [ˈhœykʏr̥ ˈhœyksɔn]; born 1 September 1991) is an Icelandic retired football right back.

== Club career ==
Haukur started his career with local club KA in 2008. He moved to KR in the Úrvalsdeild before the 2012 season. After the Icelandic 2014 season Haukur signed a five-year contract with AIK in Sweden. In November 2018 Haukur rejoined his local club KA to play with them in Úrvalsdeild.

== International career ==
Haukur made his first international appearance on 19 January 2015 in a match against Canada, playing the entire match.

He was selected for EURO 2016.

== Career statistics ==
As of match played 30 November 2018

Appearances and goals by club, season and competition
Club	Season	League			Cup		Continental		Total	
Club	Season	Division	Apps	Goals	Apps	Goals	Apps	Goals	Apps	Goals
KA	2008	1. deild	19	0	0	0	—		19	0
KA	2009	1. deild	22	1	0	0	—		22	1
KA	2010	1. deild	19	2	2	0	—		21	2
KA	2011	1. deild	20	4	1	0	—		21	4
KA	Total		80	7	3	0	—		83	7
KR	2012	Úrvalsdeild	15	1	5	0	1	0	21	1
KR	2013	Úrvalsdeild	16	1	4	0	3	0	23	1
KR	2014	Úrvalsdeild	21	1	6	0	2	0	29	1
KR	Total		52	3	15	0	6	0	73	3
AIK	2015	Allsvenskan	23	0	3	0	4	0	30	0
AIK	2016	Allsvenskan	18	4	5	2	2	0	25	6
AIK	2017	Allsvenskan	12	1	3	0	0	0	15	1
AIK	2018	Allsvenskan	4	0	5	0	2	0	11	0
AIK	Total		57	5	16	2	8	0	81	7
Career total			185	15	29	2	12	0	226	16
