= Oscar Linnér =

Swedish footballer (born 1997)

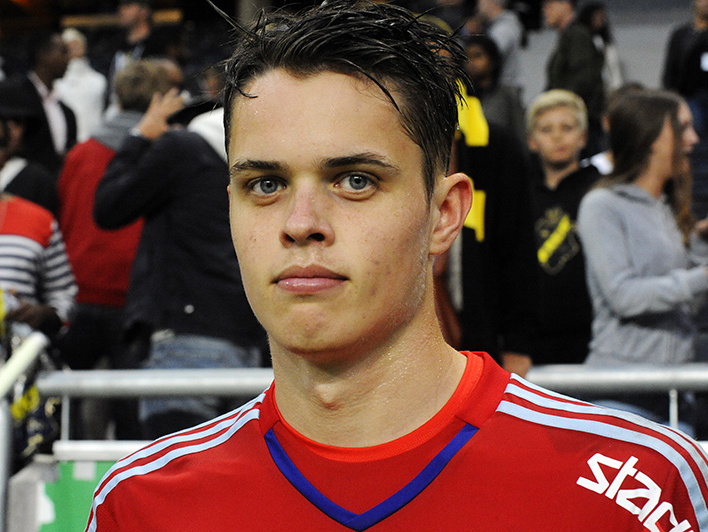
- Linnér with AIK in July 2015

Personal information
- Full name: Oscar Carl Linnér
- Date of birth: 23 February 1997 (age 29)
- Place of birth: Danderyd, Sweden
- Height: 1.99 m (6 ft 6 in)
- Position: Goalkeeper

Youth career
- 2002–2007: Stocksunds
- 2007–2015: FC Djursholm
- 2009–2010: → Brommapojkarna (loan)
- 2012: → Brommapojkarna (loan)
- 2015: AIK

Senior career*
Years	Team	Apps	(Gls)
2015–2020	AIK	81	(0)
2020–2022	Arminia Bielefeld	0	(0)
2021–2022	→ Brescia (loan)	1	(0)
2022	→ GIF Sundsvall (loan)	0	(0)
2022	AaB	0	(0)
2023	Brommapojkarna	3	(0)
2024	Vendsyssel	11	(0)
2024–2025	Petrolul Ploiești	2	(0)
2025	KTP	12	(0)
2026	Falkenberg	1	(0)

International career
2015	Sweden U18	3	(0)
2015–2016	Sweden U19	5	(0)
2018	Sweden U21	2	(0)
2019	Sweden	1	(0)
- * Club domestic league appearances and goals as of 20 July 2026

Oscar Carl Linnér (born 23 February 1997) is a Swedish professional footballer who plays as a goalkeeper. He has represented the Sweden national team.

== Club career ==
=== AIK ===
Linnér made his debut for AIK in a UEFA Europa League qualifier match against VPS.

=== Arminia Bielefeld ===
On 7 January 2020, Linnér joined Arminia Bielefeld on a three-and-a-half-year deal.

==== Loan to Brescia ====
On 11 August 2021, Linnér joined Serie B club Brescia on a season-long loan deal, with an option to buy.

==== Loan to Sundsvall ====
On 6 February 2022, Linnér was loaned to Sundsvall. However, he left the club after only two months. On 24 August 2022, Linnér's contract with Arminia was dissolved.

=== AaB ===
With first goalkeeper Josip Posavec injured, Danish Superliga club AaB confirmed on 16 October that they had signed Linnér to a short contract for the remainder of 2022.

=== Vendsyssel ===
After a short spell at IF Brommapojkarna in Sweden, Linnér returned to Denmark, signing a short-term deal with Danish 1st Division club Vendsyssel FF until the end of the season. On May 29, 2024, Vendsyssel confirmed that Linnér would leave the club at the end of June 2024.

=== Petrolul Ploiești ===
On 5 November 2024, Linnér joined Romanian Liga I club Petrolul Ploiești on a deal until June 2026.

=== KTP ===
On 2 July 2025, Linnér signed with KTP in Finnish Veikkausliiga for the remainder of the season.

=== Falkenberg ===
In June Linnér joined Superettan side Falkenbergs FF on short-team deal due to injuries to the keepers at the club. On 1 July 2026, he left the club again.

== International career ==
Linnér made his debut for the Sweden national team on 11 January 2019 in a friendly against Iceland, as a starter.

== Personal life ==
Oscar Linnér has a two-years-younger brother, Albin Linnér, who is also professional footballer.

== Career statistics ==
As of match played 2 July 2026

Appearances and goals by club, season and competition
Club	Season	League			National cup (Note: Includes Svenska Cupen, Danish Cup)		Continental		Total	
Club	Season	Division	Apps	Goals	Apps	Goals	Apps	Goals	Apps	Goals
AIK	2015	Allsvenskan	2	0	0	0	0	0	2	0
AIK	2016	Allsvenskan	2	0	0	0	2 (Note: Appearances in UEFA Europa League)	0	4	0
AIK	2017	Allsvenskan	29	0	5	0	0	0	34	0
AIK	2018	Allsvenskan	21	0	5	0	6	0	32	0
AIK	2019	Allsvenskan	27	0	4	0	4	0	35	0
AIK	2020	Allsvenskan	0	0	0	0	8 (Note: Four appearances in UEFA Champions League, four appearances in UEFA Europa League)	0	8	0
AIK	Total		81	0	14	0	20	0	115	0
Arminia Bielefeld	2019–20	2. Bundesliga	0	0	0	0	—		0	0
Arminia Bielefeld	2020–21	Bundesliga	0	0	0	0	—		0	0
Arminia Bielefeld	Total		0	0	0	0	—		0	0
Brescia (loan)	2021–22	Serie B	1	0	—		—		1	0
GIF Sundsvall (loan)	2022	Allsvenskan	0	0	0	0	—		0	0
AaB	2022–23	Danish Superliga	0	0	1	0	0	0	1	0
Brommapojkarna	2023	Allsvenskan	3	0	—		—		3	0
Vendsyssel	2023–24	Danish 1st Division	11	0	—		—		11	0
Petrolul Ploiești	2024–25	Liga I	2	0	1	0	—		3	0
KTP	2025	Veikkausliiga	14	0	—		—		14	0
Falkenberg	2026	Superettan	1	0	—		—		1	0
Career total			113	0	16	0	20	0	149	0

== Honours ==
AIK

- Allsvenskan: 2018

Arminia Bielefeld

- 2. Bundesliga: 2019–20
