= 2014 AIK Fotboll season =

AIK
2014 season
- Chairman: Johan Segui
- Manager: Andreas Alm
- Stadium: Skytteholms IP; Friends Arena
- Allsvenskan: 2nd
- 2014–15 Svenska Cupen: Progress to 2015 season
- UEFA Europa League: Third Qualifying Round vs Astana
- Top goalscorer: League: Nabil Bahoui (14); All: Nabil Bahoui (15)
- Highest home attendance: 30,650 vs IFK Göteborg (31 March 2014)
- Lowest home attendance: 9,570 vs Linfield (24 July 2014)
- Average home league attendance: 16,513 (Allsvenskan - 1 November 2014); 15,857 (All competitions - 1 November 2014)
Home colours	Away colours	Third colours

The 2014 season was AIK's 123rd in existence, their 86th season in Allsvenskan and their 9th consecutive season in the league. The team competed in the Allsvenskan and UEFA Europa League.

== Season events ==
Prior to the start of the season, AIK announced the signings of Panajotis Dimitriadis and Niclas Eliasson to four-year contracts and Eero Markkanen to a three-year contract. Whilst both Daniel Gustavsson and Alhassan Kamara left to join Örebro.

On 6 January, Daniel Majstorović left AIK after his contract was terminated by mutual consent.

On 13 January, AIK announced that Christian Kouakou had let the club to sign for IF Brommapojkarna.

On 16 January, AIK announced the return of Kenny Pavey on a two-year contract from Öster.

On 28 January, AIK announced the return of Teteh Bangura on loan until August 2014, from Bursaspor.

On 17 February, AIK announced that Niklas Backman had been sold to Dalian Aerbin.

On 18 July, AIK announced that Robin Quaison had left the club to join Palermo.

On 23 July, AIK announced that Eero Markkanen had left the club to join Real Madrid.

On 25 July, AIK announced the signing of Sauli Väisänen from Honka.

On 6 August, AIK announced that Teteh Bangura would leave the club at the end of his loan spell on 31 August.

On 11 August, AIK announced the loan signing of Gabriel Ferreyra from Boca Juniors, until 31 December 2015.

== Squad ==
As of match played 1 November 2014

No.	Name	Nationality	Position	Date of birth (age)	Signed from	Signed in	Contract ends	Apps.	Goals
Goalkeepers
13	Kyriakos Stamatopoulos	(Canada)	GK	28 August 1979 (aged 35)	Tromsø	2011		53	0
35	Patrik Carlgren	(Sweden)	GK	8 January 1992 (aged 22)	IK Brage	2013	2016	27	0
Defenders
2	Sauli Väisänen	(Finland)	DF	5 June 1994 (aged 20)	Honka	2014		6	0
3	Per Karlsson	(Sweden)	DF	2 January 1986 (aged 28)	Academy	2003			
4	Nils-Eric Johansson	(Sweden)	DF	13 January 1980 (aged 34)	Leicester City	2007		256	13
6	Alexander Milošević	(Sweden)	DF	30 January 1992 (aged 22)	Vasalund	2011	2014	87	4
16	Martin Lorentzson	(Sweden)	DF	21 July 1984 (aged 30)	Assyriska	2010		154	15
18	Noah Sundberg	(Sweden)	DF	6 June 1996 (aged 18)	Academy	2013		6	1
Midfielders
5	Panajotis Dimitriadis	(Sweden)	MF	12 August 1986 (aged 28)	Brommapojkarna	2014	2017	6	0
10	Celso Borges	(Costa Rica)	MF	27 May 1988 (aged 26)	Fredrikstad	2012		97	23
11	Nabil Bahoui	(Sweden)	MF	5 February 1991 (aged 23)	Brommapojkarna	2013	2016	63	24
14	Kenny Pavey	(England)	MF	23 August 1979 (aged 35)	Öster	2014	2015	171	16
15	Gabriel Ferreyra	(Argentina)	MF	3 February 1994 (aged 20)	on loan from Boca Juniors	2014	2015	2	0
17	Ebenezer Ofori	(Ghana)	MF	1 July 1995 (aged 19)	New Edubiase United	2013	2016	31	1
20	Ibrahim Moro	(Ghana)	MF	10 November 1993 (aged 20)	New Edubiase United	2012		64	2
25	Sam Lundholm	(Sweden)	MF	1 July 1994 (aged 20)	Academy	2012		23	1
26	Nicklas Maripuu	(Sweden)	MF	2 March 1992 (aged 22)	Väsby United	2010		14	0
28	Niclas Eliasson	(Sweden)	MF	7 December 1995 (aged 18)	Falkenberg	2014	2017	17	1
29	Anton Salétros	(Sweden)	MF	12 April 1996 (aged 18)	Academy	2013		21	0
30	Lalawélé Atakora	(Togo)	MF	9 November 1990 (aged 23)	Fredrikstad	2011	2015	52	3
Forwards
21	Kennedy Igboananike	(Nigeria)	FW	26 February 1989 (aged 25)	Djurgården	2013	2015	63	22
22	Kwame Karikari	(Ghana)	FW	20 January 1992 (aged 22)	International Allies	2011	2015	58	9
24	Marko Nikolić	(Sweden)	FW	17 September 1997 (aged 17)	Academy	2014		11	1
36	Henok Goitom	(Sweden)	FW	22 September 1984 (aged 30)	Almería	2012		75	25
Out on loan
23	Edward Owusu	(Sweden)	DF	13 January 1994 (aged 20)	Brommapojkarna	2011		0	0
Left during the season
7	Eero Markkanen	(Finland)	FW	3 July 1991 (aged 23)	JJK Jyväskylä	2014	2016	14	6
15	Robin Quaison	(Sweden)	MF	9 October 1993 (aged 21)	Academy	2011		63	8
19	Teteh Bangura	(Sierra Leone)	FW	27 December 1989 (aged 24)	on loan from Bursaspor	2014	2014	18	15

== Transfers ==
=== In ===
Date	Position	Nationality	Name	From	Fee	Ref.
1 January 2014	MF	(Sweden)	Panajotis Dimitriadis	Brommapojkarna	Free	
1 January 2014	MF	(Sweden)	Niclas Eliasson	Falkenberg	Undisclosed	
1 January 2014	FW	(Finland)	Eero Markkanen	JJK Jyväskylä	Undisclosed	
16 January 2014	MF	(England)	Kenny Pavey	Öster	Free	
25 July 2014	DF	(Finland)	Sauli Väisänen	Honka	Undisclosed	

=== Loans in ===
Start date	Position	Nationality	Name	From	End date	Ref.
28 January 2014	FW	(Sierra Leone)	Teteh Bangura	Bursaspor	31 August 2014	
11 August 2014	MF	(Argentina)	Gabriel Ferreyra	Boca Juniors	31 December 2015	

=== Out ===
Date	Position	Nationality	Name	To	Fee	Ref.
1 January 2014	MF	(Sweden)	Daniel Gustavsson	Örebro	Undisclosed	
1 January 2014	FW	(Sierra Leone)	Alhassan Kamara	Örebro	Undisclosed	
13 January 2014	FW	(Sweden)	Christian Kouakou	Brommapojkarna	Undisclosed	
17 February 2014	DF	(Sweden)	Niklas Backman	Dalian Aerbin	Undisclosed	
18 July 2014	MF	(Sweden)	Robin Quaison	Palermo	Undisclosed	
23 July 2014	FW	(Finland)	Eero Markkanen	Real Madrid	Undisclosed	

=== Released ===
Date	Position	Nationality	Name	Joined	Date	Ref
6 January 2014	DF	(Sweden)	Daniel Majstorović	Retirement	4 February 2014	
31 December 2014	DF	(Sweden)	Martin Lorentzson	Åtvidaberg		

== Friendlies ==
19 January 2014	Vasalunds IF	2–5	AIK	Stockholm
18:00 CET (UTC+1)	Nordström 20'; Kabran 65'	Report	Igboananike 21'; Markkanen 36', 75'; Eliasson 40'; Salétros 57'	Stadium: Skytteholms IP; Attendance: 948; Referee: Farouk Nehdi

27 January 2014 2014 Copa del Sol	AIK	1–4	Molde	La Manga, Spain
16:00 CET (UTC+1)	Bahoui (yellow card) 27'; Backman 57'; Igboananike (yellow card) 66'; Quaison (yellow card) 33' (yellow-red card) 67'; Borges (yellow card) 55' (yellow-red card) 78'	Report	Chukwu 22'; Toivio (yellow card) 28' (goal) 45'; E.Hestad 51'; Høiland 90+1'	Stadium: La Manga Stadium; Attendance: 120; Referee: Antti Munukka

30 January 2014 2014 Copa del Sol	Rosenborg	5–2	AIK	La Manga, Spain
16:00 CET (UTC+1)	Søderlund 9' (pen.); Helland 32'; Nielsen (yellow card) 35'; Moe (yellow card) 57'; Chibuike 60', 75'; Mikkelsen 81'; Sørloth (yellow card) 83'	Report	Eliasson 3'; Markkanen 12'; Johansson (yellow card) 20'; Igboananike (yellow card) 24'; Salétros (yellow card) 63'	Stadium: La Manga Stadium; Attendance: 150; Referee: Antti Munukka

2 February 2014 2014 Copa del Sol	Astra Giurgiu	1–0	AIK	La Manga, Spain
16:00 CET (UTC+1)	Papp 74'	Report		Stadium: La Manga Stadium; Attendance: 70

5 February 2014	AIK	2–2	Costuleni	San Pedro del Pinatar, Spain
16:00 CET (UTC+1)	Quaison 56'; Markkanen 70'	Report	Lavrinovic 87'; Negru 90'	Stadium: Pinatar Arena; Referee: Kristinn Jakobsson

15 February 2014	AIK	2–1	Elfsborg	Stockholm
13:00 CET (UTC+1)	Borges (yellow card) 48' (goal) 67' (pen.); Johansson 59'	Report	Nilsson 3'; Frick (yellow card) 25'; Rohdén (yellow card) 44'; Claesson (yellow card) 66'	Stadium: Skytteholms IP; Attendance: 3,187; Referee: Markus Strömbergsson

23 February 2014	Liaoning Whowin	v	AIK	Shenzhen, China PR
08:00 CET (UTC+1)		Report		Stadium: Bao'an Stadium

1 March 2014	Shenzhen Ruby	3–2	AIK	Shenzhen, China PR
06:00 CET (UTC+1)		Report		Stadium: New Shenzhen Stadium

1 March 2014	Guangzhou R&F	1–0	AIK	Shenzhen, China PR
08:30 CET (UTC+1)		Report		Stadium: New Shenzhen Stadium

16 March 2014	AIK	2–2	HJK Helsinki	Stockholm
13:00 CET (UTC+1)	Igboananike 3' (yellow card) 68'; Goitom 27'; Johansson (yellow card) 71'; Borges (yellow card) 87'	Report	Tainio (yellow card) 14'; Savage 25', 36'; Heikkinen (yellow card) 90'	Stadium: Skytteholms IP; Attendance: 1,513; Referee: Johan Hamlin

23 March 2014	AIK	3–0	Kalmar	Stockholm
13:00 CET (UTC+1)	Lorentzson 42', 86'; Ofori (yellow card) 43' (yellow-red card) 47'; Bahoui 49'	Report	Ismael (yellow card) 63'; Nilsson (yellow card) 73'	Stadium: Skytteholms IP; Attendance: 1,840; Referee: Glenn Nyberg

18 June 2014	Örebro	3–0	AIK	Örebro
16:00 CEST (UTC+2)	Holmberg 26', 62', 69'	Report	Salétros (yellow card) 43'; Johansson (yellow card) 66'; Owusu (yellow card) 71'	Stadium: Behrn Arena; Attendance: 612; Referee: Magnus Ahlsén

27 June 2014	Rosenborg	2–3	AIK	Trondheim, Norway
15:00 CEST (UTC+2)	Selnæs 18'; Riski 63'	Report	Bahoui 14'; Ofori 78'; Goitom 81'	Stadium: Lerkendal Stadion; Attendance: 250; Referee: Kristian Aune

6 November 2014	AIK	3–2	Syrianska FC	Stockholm
18:00 CET (UTC+1)	Tukiainen 1', 87'; Nikolić 44'; Sundberg (yellow card) 68'	Report	Liljestrand (yellow card) 18'; Stamatopoulos 69' (o.g.); Ljuboje 74'	Stadium: Skytteholms IP; Attendance: 200; Referee: Ozan Camlibel

13 November 2014	AIK	1–2	AFC United	Stockholm
14:15 CET (UTC+1)	Mansiamina 29'	Report	Pereira 21'; Nushi 83'	Stadium: Skytteholms IP; Attendance: 400; Referee: Victor Wolf

20 November 2014	AIK	2–0	Östersund	Solna
14:00 CET (UTC+1)	Milošević 3' (pen.); Nikolić 75'	Report	Hopcutt (yellow card) 77'	Stadium: Skytteholms IP (B); Attendance: 250; Referee: Dragan Banjac

== Competitions ==
=== Overview ===
Competition	First match	Last match	Starting round	Final position	Record							
Competition	First match	Last match	Starting round	Final position	Pld	W	D	L	GF	GA	GD	Win %
Allsvenskan	31 March 2014	1 November 2014	Matchday 1	3rd	30	15	7	8	59	42	+17	50.00
Svenska Cupen	20 August 2014	Progress to 2015 season	Second Round	Progress to 2015 season	1	1	0	0	2	0	+2	100.00
UEFA Europa League	17 July 2014	7 August 2014	Second qualifying round	Third qualifying round	4	1	1	2	3	5	−2	25.00
Total					35	17	8	10	64	47	+17	48.57

Last updated: 1 November 2014
Source: Competitions

=== Allsvenskan ===
==== League table ====
Pos	Team	Pld	W	D	L	GF	GA	GD	Pts	Qualification or relegation
1	Malmö FF (C)	30	18	8	4	59	31	+28	62	Qualification to Champions League second qualifying round
2	IFK Göteborg	30	15	11	4	58	34	+24	56	Qualification to Europa League second qualifying round (Note: IFK Göteborg qualified for the UEFA Europa League second qualifying round by winning 2014–15 Svenska Cupen.)
3	AIK	30	15	7	8	59	42	+17	52	Qualification to Europa League first qualifying round (Note: IF Elfsborg qualified for the UEFA Europa League first qualifying round as the fourth-placed team since IFK Göteborg, winners of the 2014–15 Svenska Cupen, already qualified based on league position.)
4	IF Elfsborg	30	15	7	8	40	31	+9	52	Qualification to Europa League first qualifying round
5	BK Häcken	30	13	7	10	58	45	+13	46	

Source: svenskfotboll.se (in Swedish)
Rules for classification: 1) points; 2) goal difference; 3) number of goals scored; 4) head-to-head points; 5) head-to-head goal difference; 6) head-to-head away goals scored
(C) Champions

==== Results summary ====
Overall								Home						Away					
Pld	W	D	L	GF	GA	GD	Pts	W	D	L	GF	GA	GD	W	D	L	GF	GA	GD
30	15	7	8	59	42	+17	52	9	2	4	29	17	+12	6	5	4	30	25	+5

Last updated: 1 November 2014.
Source: (in Swedish)

==== Results by round ====
Round	1	2	3	4	5	6	7	8	9	10	11	12	13	14	15	16	17	18	19	20	21	22	23	24	25	26	27	28	29	30
Ground	H	A	H	A	H	A	H	A	H	H	H	H	A	H	A	H	A	H	H	A	H	A	A	H	A	A	H	A	H	A
Result	L	W	D	W	L	D	W	D	W	W	D	W	W	W	L	W	W	W	D	L	W	W	L	L	L	D	L	W	W	D
Position	14	10	9	7	10	9	7	7	6	5	5	4	3	2	2	2	2	2	2	2	2	2	2	2	4	4	4	4	3	3

Updated to match(es) played on 1 November 2014. Source: see Results
A = Away; H = Home; W = Win; D = Draw; L = Loss

==== Results ====
31 March 2014 1	AIK	0–2	IFK Göteborg	Stockholm
19:00 CEST (UTC+2)	Karlsson (red card) 57'	Report	Vibe 14'; Haglund (yellow card) 55'; Mané 86'; J. Johansson (yellow card) 89'	Stadium: Friends Arena; Attendance: 30,650; Referee: Stefan Johannesson

6 April 2014 2	Gefle	1–2	AIK	Gävle
15:00 CEST (UTC+2)	Portin (yellow card) 25'; Williams 50'	Report	Moro (yellow card) 29'; Borges (yellow card) 51'; Milosevic 74'; Pavey (yellow card) 85'; Igboananike 86'	Stadium: Strömvallen; Attendance: 6,711; Referee: Andreas Ekberg

13 April 2014 3	AIK	1–1	Örebro	Stockholm
15:00 CEST (UTC+2)	Markkanen 6' (yellow card) 56'; Dimitriadis (yellow card) 53'	Report	Saeid (yellow card) 33'; Mensiro (yellow card) 40'; Hasani 82'	Stadium: Friends Arena; Attendance: 15,873; Referee: Johan Hamlin

16 April 2014 4	Djurgården	2–3	AIK	Stockholm
19:00 CEST (UTC+2)	Amartey (yellow card) 53'; Fejzullahu 82' (pen.) (yellow card) 88'; Radetinac 90+5'	Report	Lorentzson 24'; Goitom (yellow card) 45+2'; Bahoui 55'; Markkanen 65'; Stamatopoulos (yellow card) 82'	Stadium: Tele2 Arena; Attendance: 25,175; Referee: Jonas Eriksson

20 April 2014 5	AIK	1–2	IFK Norrköping	Stockholm
17:30 CEST (UTC+2)	Markkanen 50'; Milošević (yellow card) 90+3'	Report	Falk-Olander 5'; Lorentzson 36' (o.g.); Wahlqvist (yellow card) 50'; Gerson (yellow card) 87'	Stadium: Friends Arena; Attendance: 14,418; Referee: Markus Strömbergsson

27 April 2014 6	BK Häcken	2–2	AIK	Gothenburg
17:30 CEST (UTC+2)	El Kabir 51'; Zuta (yellow card) 67'; Strandberg 75'	Report	Borges 45', 61'	Stadium: Gamla Ullevi; Attendance: 2,813; Referee: Johan Hamlin

5 May 2014 7	AIK	2–1	Helsingborg	Stockholm
19:00 CEST (UTC+2)	Lorentzson (yellow card) 42'; Borges 44'; Bahoui (yellow card) 66'; Goitom 87'	Report	Johansson (red card) 20'; Khalili (yellow card) 40'; Accam 70'	Stadium: Friends Arena; Attendance: 13,870; Referee: Stefan Johannesson

8 May 2014 8	Halmstad	2–2	AIK	Halmstad
19:00 CEST (UTC+2)	Gyan (yellow card) 15'; Baldvinsson 65' (yellow card) 21'; Steindórsson 86' (pen.)	Report	Johansson (yellow card) 21'; Goitom 49'; Borges (yellow card) 85'; Igboananike 90'	Stadium: Örjans Vall; Attendance: 4,287; Referee: Martin Hansson

11 May 2014 9	AIK	2–1	Mjällby	Stockholm
15:00 CEST (UTC+2)	Johansson 32'; Pavey (yellow card) 42'; Borges 82' (pen.); Milošević (yellow card) 88'	Report	Blomqvist 7'; Þórisson (yellow card) 69'	Stadium: Friends Arena; Attendance: 11,778; Referee: Bojan Pandžić

15 May 2014 10	AIK	2–1	Elfsborg	Stockholm
19:00 CEST (UTC+2)	Bahoui 28'; Pavey 85'; Borges (yellow card) 90+5'	Report	Frick (yellow card) 31'; Rohdén 65'	Stadium: Friends Arena; Attendance: 13,140; Referee: Jonas Eriksson

26 May 2014 11	Malmö	2–2	AIK	Malmö
19:00 CEST (UTC+2)	Molins 63'; Jansson (yellow card) 67'; Cibicki 90+4'	Malmö FF - AIK	Milošević (yellow card) 14'; Johansson (yellow card) 39'; Markkanen 45'; Quaison 59' (yellow card) 18'; Goitom (yellow card) 67'	Stadium: Swedbank Stadion; Attendance: 17,382; Referee: Stefan Johannesson

2 June 2014 12	AIK	4–2	IF Brommapojkarna	Stockholm
19:00 CEST (UTC+2)	Bahoui 7', 38'; Markkanen 26', 32'; Moro (yellow card) 40'; Pavey (yellow card) 85'	Report	Petrović 5'; Rexhepi 28'; Vazgeč (yellow card) 30'; Falkeborn (yellow card) 88'	Stadium: Friends Arena; Attendance: 15,637; Referee: Michael Lerjéus

7 July 2014 13	Åtvidaberg	0–3	AIK	Åtvidaberg
19:00 CEST (UTC+2)	da Silva (yellow card) 26'; Owoeri (yellow card) 45'; Karlsson (yellow card) 87'	Report	Lorentzson 14'; Bahoui 63'; Goitom 90+2'	Stadium: Kopparvallen; Attendance: 6,028; Referee: Andreas Ekberg

12 July 2014 14	AIK	3–0	Kalmar FF	Stockholm
16:00 CEST (UTC+2)	Bahoui 24' (yellow card) 67'; Milošević 51'; Johansson (yellow card) 90+5'; Moro 90+8'	Report	Ring (yellow card) 25'; Elm (yellow card) 88'; Nouri (yellow card) 90+3' (yellow-red card) 90+3'	Stadium: Friends Arena; Attendance: 13,470; Referee: Michael Lerjéus

20 July 2014 15	Falkenberg	4–1	AIK	Falkenberg
15:00 CEST (UTC+2)	Ingelsten 24'; T.Karlsson (yellow card) 52'; Rodevåg 57'; Vall 87'; Nilsson 90+3'	Report	Sonko Sundberg 53'; Borges (yellow card) 74'	Stadium: Falkenbergs IP; Attendance: 5,457; Referee: Bojan Pandžić

28 July 2014 16	AIK	3–0	Falkenberg	Stockholm
19:00 CEST (UTC+2)	Lorentzson 26'; Johansson 49' (yellow card) 61'; Moro 90+3'	Report		Stadium: Friends Arena; Attendance: 11,408; Referee: Kristoffer Karlsson

4 August 2014 17	IFK Göteborg	0–2	AIK	Gothenburg
19:05 CEST (UTC+2)	A. Johansson (yellow card) 48'; Wæhler (red card) 54'	Report	Igboananike 34'; Bahoui 60'; Moro (yellow card) 67'; Väisänen (yellow card) 52' (yellow-red card) 84'; Karlsson (yellow card) 89'	Stadium: Gamla Ullevi; Attendance: 14,547; Referee: Martin Hansson

10 August 2014 18	AIK	3–1	Gefle	Stockholm
17:30 CEST (UTC+2)	Pavey (yellow card) 19'; Goitom 65', 89', 90+3'	Report	Hansson 49'; Bååth (yellow card) 68'; Lantto (yellow card) 85'	Stadium: Friends Arena; Attendance: 12,097; Referee: Andreas Ekberg

13 August 2014 19	AIK	1–1	Djurgården	Stockholm
19:05 CEST (UTC+2)	Bahoui 54'; Moro (yellow card) 72'	Report	Arvidsson (yellow card) 42'; Karlsson 60' (o.g.); Andersson (yellow card) 86'	Stadium: Friends Arena; Attendance: 28,240; Referee: Michael Lerjéus

17 August 2014 20	Örebro	4–2	AIK	Örebro
15:00 CEST (UTC+2)	Kamara 8'; Pode 17', 21'; Sobralense (yellow card) 63'; Yasin 90+2'	Report	Bahoui (yellow card) 12'; Goitom 43'; Moro (yellow card) 47'; Igboananike 77'	Stadium: Behrn Arena; Attendance: 8,393; Referee: Glenn Nyberg

24 August 2014 21	AIK	1–0	BK Häcken	Stockholm
17:30 CEST (UTC+2)	Goitom 13'; Ofori (yellow card) 55'; Johansson (yellow card) 90'; Moro (yellow card) 90+1'	Report	Lewicki (yellow card) 61'	Stadium: Friends Arena; Attendance: 14,420; Referee: Johan Hamlin

31 August 2014 22	IFK Norrköping	2–4	AIK	Norrköping
15:00 CEST (UTC+2)	Skagestad 79'; Johansson (yellow card) 81'; Kamara 90+1'	Report	Goitom 23', 55'; Ofori (yellow card) 30'; Lundholm 62'; Eliasson 87'	Stadium: Idrottsparken; Attendance: 8,109; Referee: Martin Hansson

15 September 2014 23	Helsingborg	3–1	AIK	Helsingborg
19:05 CEST (UTC+2)	Andersson 38'; Accam 42' 45' (yellow card) 51'	Report	Karlsson (yellow card) 37'; Igboananike 61'	Stadium: Olympia; Attendance: 6,847; Referee: Markus Strömbergsson

21 September 2014 24	AIK	0–1	Halmstad	Stockholm
15:00 CEST (UTC+2)	Pavey (yellow card) 88'	Report	Blomberg 9' (yellow card) 72'	Stadium: Friends Arena; Attendance: 16,103; Referee: Andreas Ekberg

24 September 2014 25	Mjällby	1–0	AIK	Hällevik
19:00 CEST (UTC+2)	Wilhelmsson 50'	Report		Stadium: Strandvallen; Attendance: 4,022; Referee: Jonas Eriksson

28 September 2014 26	Elfsborg	1–1	AIK	Borås
17:30 CEST (UTC+2)	Hedlund (yellow card) 17' (goal) 65'	Report	Moro (yellow card) 38'; Bahoui 84'; Sundberg (yellow card) 86'; Borges (yellow card) 87'; Ofori (yellow card) 90+1'	Stadium: Borås Arena; Attendance: 8,277; Referee: Michael Lerjéus

5 October 2014 27	AIK	2–3	Malmö	Stockholm
17:30 CEST (UTC+2)	Atakora (yellow card) 25'; Pavey (yellow card) 48'; Lorentzson (yellow card) 66'; Bahoui 67' 85'	Report	Johansson (yellow card) 7'; Ricardinho (yellow card) 21'; Thelin 39'; Eriksson 51'; Halsti (yellow card) 78'; Rosenberg 86'	Stadium: Friends Arena; Attendance: 23,247; Referee: Jonas Eriksson

19 October 2014 28	Brommapojkarna	0–4	AIK	Stockholm
17:30 CEST (UTC+2)	Karlström (yellow card) 63'	Report	Moro (yellow card) 26'; Bahoui 29'; Ofori (yellow card) 39'; Goitom 61' 71'; Borges 64'; Johansson (yellow card) 90+1'	Stadium: Grimsta IP; Attendance: 5,136; Referee: Bojan Pandžić

26 October 2014 29	AIK	4–1	Åtvidaberg	Stockholm
15:00 CEST (UTC+2)	Ofori 7'; Bahoui 33' 42'; Milošević 70'	Report	Santos 67'	Stadium: Friends Arena; Attendance: 13,342; Referee: Glenn Nyberg

1 November 2014 30	Kalmar FF	1–1	AIK	Kalmar
13:00 CET (UTC+1)	Hovda (yellow card) 48'; Solheim 51'	Report	Borges 22'	Stadium: Guldfågeln Arena; Attendance: 6,551; Referee: Ekberg

=== Svenska Cupen ===
20 August 2014 Second Round	IFK Luleå	0–2	AIK	Luleå
19:00 CEST (UTC+2)	Kallay (yellow card) 31'; Eriksson (yellow card) 67'	Report	Goitom 74'; Salétros (yellow card) 78'; Nikolić 83'	Stadium: Skogsvallen; Attendance: 2,816; Referee: Lars Olsson

The Group Stage took place during the 2015 season.

=== UEFA Europa League ===
==== Qualifying rounds ====
17 July 2014 Second qualifying round 1st leg	Linfield (Northern Ireland)	1–0	(Sweden) AIK	Lurgan, Northern Ireland
20:45 CEST (UTC+2)	Waterworth (yellow card) 83' (goal) 87'; Burns (yellow card) 90+1'	Report	Bahoui (yellow card) 33'; Igboananike (yellow card) 61'	Stadium: Mourneview Park; Attendance: 1,741; Referee: Rene Eisner (Austria)

24 July 2014 Second qualifying round 2nd leg	AIK (Sweden)	2–0 (2–1 agg.)	(Northern Ireland) Linfield	Stockholm, Sweden
19:00 CEST (UTC+2)	Bahoui (yellow card) 34'; Igboananike 55'; Goitom 72'	Report	Re.Glendinning (yellow card) 45'; Sproule (yellow card) 48'; Waterworth (yellow card) 70'	Stadium: Friends Arena; Attendance: 9,570; Referee: Fredy Fautrel (France)

31 July 2014 Third qualifying round 1st leg	Astana (Kazakhstan)	1–1	(Sweden) AIK	Astana, Kazakhstan
16:00 CEST (UTC+2)	Cañas (yellow card) 12'; Nusserbayev 42'; Dzholchiev (yellow card) 59'; Dmitrenko (yellow card) 80'	Report	Bahoui 9' (yellow card) 60'; Salétros (yellow card) 65'; Milošević (yellow card) 81'; Pavey (yellow card) 84'; Johansson (yellow card) 88'	Stadium: Astana Arena; Attendance: 16,200; Referee: Ante Vučemilović-Šimunović Jr. (Croatia)

7 August 2014 Third qualifying round 2nd leg	AIK (Sweden)	0–3 (1–4 agg.)	(Kazakhstan) Astana	Stockholm, Sweden
19:00 CEST (UTC+2)	Borges (yellow card) 68' (yellow-red card) 84'; Moro (yellow card) 90'	Report	Aničić (yellow card) 33'; Kéthévoama 36'; Zhukov (yellow card) 52'; Shomko 54'; Dzholchiev (yellow card) 66' (goal) 71'	Stadium: Friends Arena; Attendance: 12,314; Referee: Michael Koukoulakis (Greece)

== Squad statistics ==
As of match played 1 November 2014

=== Appearances and goals ===
No.	Pos	Nat	Player	Total		Allsvenskan		Svenska Cupen		UEFA Europa League	
No.	Pos	Nat	Player	Apps	Goals	Apps	Goals	Apps	Goals	Apps	Goals
2	DF	(Finland) FIN	Sauli Väisänen	6	0	4+2	0	0	0	0	0
3	DF	(Sweden) SWE	Per Karlsson	31	0	26	0	1	0	4	0
4	DF	(Sweden) SWE	Nils-Eric Johansson	32	2	27	2	1	0	4	0
5	DF	(Sweden) SWE	Panajotis Dimitriadis	6	0	5+1	0	0	0	0	0
6	DF	(Sweden) SWE	Alexander Milošević	31	3	27	3	1	0	3	0
10	MF	(Costa Rica) CRC	Celso Borges	29	6	26	6	0	0	3	0
11	MF	(Sweden) SWE	Nabil Bahoui	30	15	26	14	1	0	3	1
13	GK	(Canada) CAN	Kyriakos Stamatopoulos	8	0	8	0	0	0	0	0
14	MF	(England) ENG	Kenny Pavey	22	1	6+13	1	0	0	2+1	0
15	MF	(Argentina) ARG	Gabriel Ferreyra	2	0	1+1	0	0	0	0	0
16	DF	(Sweden) SWE	Martin Lorentzson	33	3	28	3	1	0	4	0
17	MF	(Ghana) GHA	Ebenezer Ofori	26	1	22+1	1	0+1	0	1+1	0
18	DF	(Sweden) SWE	Noah Sundberg	6	1	4+1	1	0	0	1	0
20	MF	(Ghana) GHA	Ibrahim Moro	28	2	22+1	2	1	0	3+1	0
21	FW	(Nigeria) NGA	Kennedy Igboananike	30	6	17+9	5	1	0	2+1	1
22	FW	(Ghana) GHA	Kwame Karikari	6	0	0+4	0	0	0	2	0
24	FW	(Sweden) SWE	Marko Nikolić	11	1	0+9	0	0+1	1	0+1	0
25	MF	(Sweden) SWE	Sam Lundholm	14	1	5+7	1	1	0	1	0
28	MF	(Sweden) SWE	Niclas Eliasson	17	1	6+10	1	0+1	0	0	0
29	MF	(Sweden) SWE	Anton Salétros	20	0	3+12	0	1	0	3+1	0
30	MF	(Togo) TOG	Lalawélé Atakora	3	0	1+1	0	0	0	0+1	0
35	GK	(Sweden) SWE	Patrik Carlgren	27	0	22	0	1	0	4	0
36	FW	(Sweden) SWE	Henok Goitom	33	14	27+1	12	1	1	4	1
Players away on loan:
Players who appeared for AIK but left during the season:
7	FW	(Finland) FIN	Eero Markkanen	14	6	9+5	6	0	0	0	0
15	MF	(Sweden) SWE	Robin Quaison	10	1	8+2	1	0	0	0	0

=== Goal scorers ===
Place	Position	Nation	Number	Name	Allsvenskan	Svenska Cupen	UEFA Europa League	Total
1	MF	(Sweden)	11	Nabil Bahoui	14	0	1	15
2	FW	(Sweden)	36	Henok Goitom	12	1	1	14
3	FW	(Finland)	7	Eero Markkanen	6	0	0	6
3	MF	(Costa Rica)	10	Celso Borges	6	0	0	6
3	FW	(Nigeria)	21	Kennedy Igboananike	5	0	1	6
6	DF	(Sweden)	6	Alexander Milošević	3	0	0	3
6	DF	(Sweden)	16	Martin Lorentzson	3	0	0	3
8	DF	(Sweden)	4	Nils-Eric Johansson	2	0	0	2
8	MF	(Ghana)	20	Ibrahim Moro	2	0	0	2
10	MF	(England)	14	Kenny Pavey	1	0	0	1
10	MF	(Sweden)	15	Robin Quaison	1	0	0	1
10	MF	(Ghana)	17	Ebenezer Ofori	1	0	0	1
10	DF	(Sweden)	18	Noah Sundberg	1	0	0	1
10	MF	(Sweden)	25	Sam Lundholm	1	0	0	1
10	MF	(Sweden)	28	Niclas Eliasson	1	0	0	1
10	FW	(Sweden)	24	Marko Nikolić	0	1	0	1
TOTALS					59	2	3	64

=== Clean sheets ===
Place	Position	Nation	Number	Name	Allsvenskan	Svenska Cupen	UEFA Europa League	Total
1	GK	(Sweden)	35	Patrik Carlgren	6	1	1	8
TOTALS					6	1	1	8

=== Disciplinary record ===
Number	Nation	Position	Name	Allsvenskan		Svenska Cupen		UEFA Europa League		Total	
Number	Nation	Position	Name	Booked	Sent off (straight red)	Booked	Sent off (straight red)	Booked	Sent off (straight red)	Booked	Sent off (straight red)
2	(Finland)	DF	Sauli Väisänen	2	1	0	0	0	0	2	1
3	(Sweden)	DF	Per Karlsson	2	1	0	0	0	0	2	1
4	(Sweden)	DF	Nils-Eric Johansson	6	0	0	0	1	0	7	0
5	(Sweden)	DF	Panajotis Dimitriadis	1	0	0	0	0	0	1	0
6	(Sweden)	DF	Alexander Milošević	3	0	0	0	1	0	4	0
10	(Costa Rica)	MF	Celso Borges	5	0	0	0	2	1	7	1
11	(Sweden)	MF	Nabil Bahoui	4	0	0	0	3	0	7	0
13	(Canada)	GK	Kyriakos Stamatopoulos	1	0	0	0	0	0	1	0
14	(England)	MF	Kenny Pavey	6	0	0	0	1	0	7	0
16	(Sweden)	DF	Martin Lorentzson	2	0	0	0	0	0	2	0
17	(Ghana)	MF	Ebenezer Ofori	4	0	0	0	0	0	4	0
18	(Sweden)	DF	Noah Sundberg	1	0	0	0	0	0	1	0
20	(Ghana)	MF	Ibrahim Moro	8	0	0	0	1	0	9	0
21	(Nigeria)	FW	Kennedy Igboananike	0	0	0	0	1	0	1	0
29	(Sweden)	MF	Anton Salétros	0	0	1	0	1	0	2	0
30	(Togo)	MF	Lalawélé Atakora	1	0	0	0	0	0	1	0
36	(Sweden)	FW	Henok Goitom	2	0	0	0	0	0	2	0
Players away on loan:
Players who left AIK during the season:
7	(Finland)	FW	Eero Markkanen	1	0	0	0	0	0	1	0
15	(Sweden)	MF	Robin Quaison	1	0	0	0	0	0	1	0
Total				50	2	1	0	11	1	62	2
