= 2014 Copa del Sol =

Tournament details
- Country: Spain
- Dates: 27 January - 6 February 2014
- Teams: 10

Final positions
- Champions: (Norway) Strømsgodset
- Runner-up: (Romania) Astra Giurgiu

Tournament statistics
- Matches played: 12
- Goals scored: 44 (3.67 per match)

The 2014 Copa del Sol took place in La Manga and Pinatar (Region of Murcia, Spain) between 27 January and 6 February 2014.

== Group stage ==
=== Tables ===
==== Group Blue ====
Team	Pld	W	PKW	PKL	L	GF	GA	GD	Pts
(Romania) Astra Giurgiu	3	3	0	0	0	9	1	+8	9
(Norway) Molde	3	3	0	0	0	8	2	+6	9
(Norway) Rosenborg	3	2	0	0	1	8	3	+5	6
(Sweden) AIK	3	0	0	0	3	3	10	−7	0
(Moldova) Costuleni	3	0	0	0	3	1	14	−13	0

==== Group Red ====
Team	Pld	W	PKW	PKL	L	GF	GA	GD	Pts
(Norway) Strømsgodset	3	3	0	0	0	10	1	+9	9
(Norway) Haugesund	3	2	0	0	1	8	4	+4	6
(Denmark) Vestsjælland	3	2	0	0	1	5	3	+2	6
(Angola) Benfica Luanda	3	0	0	0	3	1	6	−5	0
(Latvia) Daugava	3	0	0	0	3	2	11	−9	0

==== Round One ====
27 January 2014
14:00 CET

Costuleni (Moldova)	0–4	(Norway) Strømsgodset
		Kovács 31'; Wikheim 42', 83'; Olsen 59'

27 January 2014
17:00 CET

AIK (Sweden)	1–4	(Norway) Molde
Backman 57'		Chima Chukwu 22'; Toivio 45'; Hestad 51'; Høiland 90+2'

27 January 2014
20:00 CET

Astra Giurgiu (Romania)	1–0	(Norway) Rosenborg
Seto 59'

28 January 2014
17:00 CET

Vestsjælland (Denmark)	2–0	(Latvia) Daugava
Sørensen 25'; Festersen 90+2' (pen.)

28 January 2014
20:00 CET

Benfica Luanda (Angola)	1–3	(Norway) Haugesund
Massinga 87'		Sema 7'; Diakite 15' (o.g.); Bamberg 23'

==== Round Two ====
30 January 2014
17:00 CET

Rosenborg (Norway)	5–2	(Sweden) AIK
Søderlund 9' (pen.); Helland 32'; Chibuike 60', 75'; Mikkelsen 81'		Bahoui 3'; Markkanen 12'

30 January 2014
20:00 CET

Astra Giurgiu (Romania)	7–1	(Moldova) Costuleni
Ivanovski 33' (pen.); Budescu 51', 61'; William 58'; Yoda 82'; Júnior Morais 85'; Yazalde 90'		Cemirtan 78'

31 January 2014
14:00 CET

Daugava (Latvia)	1–4	(Norway) Haugesund
Volkovs 66'		Bamberg 12'; Engblom 30', 45'; Gytkjær 77'

31 January 2014
17:00 CET

Strømsgodset (Norway)	1–0	(Angola) Benfica Luanda
Nguen 65'

31 January 2014
20:00 CET

Molde (Norway)	2–1	(Denmark) Vestsjælland
Hovland 8'; Gulbrandsen 10'		Kristiansen 54'

==== Round Three ====
2 February 2014
17:00 CET

Astra Giurgiu (Romania)	1–0	(Sweden) AIK
Papp 74'

2 February 2014
20:00 CET

Costuleni (Moldova)	0–3	(Norway) Rosenborg
		Strandberg 56'; Bille Nielsen 65'; Helland 69'

3 February 2014
14:00 CET

Strømsgodset (Norway)	5–1	(Latvia) Daugava
Kovács 12'; Horn 14'; Nilsen 56', 89'; Keita 84'		Ševeļovs 58'

3 February 2014
17:00 CET

Haugesund (Norway)	1–2	(Denmark) Vestsjælland
Andreassen 22'		Sørensen 52'; Madsen 66'

3 February 2014
20:00 CET

Molde (Norway)	2–0	(Angola) Benfica Luanda
Hoseth 45+2' (pen.); Toivio 57'

==== Final ====
CET

Strømsgodset (Norway)	1–0	Astra Giurgiu (Romania)
Olsen 83'

== Goalscorers ==
2 goals (6 players)

- (Romania) Constantin Budescu (Astra Giurgiu)
- (Brazil) Daniel Bamberg (Haugesund)
- (Sweden) Pontus Engblom (Haugesund)
- (Norway) Thomas Lehne Olsen (Strømsgodset)
- (Nigeria) John Chibuike (Rosenborg)
- (Norway) Pål André Helland (Rosenborg)
- (Norway) Gustav Wikheim (Strømsgodset)

1 goal (31 players)

- (Sweden) Niklas Backman (AIK)
- (Sweden) Nabil Bahoui (AIK)
- (Finland) Eero Markkanen (AIK)
- (Japan) Takayuki Seto (Astra Giurgiu)
- (North Macedonia) Mirko Ivanovski (Astra Giurgiu)
- (Brazil) William Amorim (Astra Giurgiu)
- (France) Abdoul Yoda (Astra Giurgiu)
- (Brazil) Júnior Morais (Astra Giurgiu)
- (Portugal) Yazalde Gomes Pinto (Astra Giurgiu)
- (Romania) Paul Papp (Astra Giurgiu)
- (Angola) Massinga (Benfica Luanda)
- (Moldova) Vadim Cemirtan (Costuleni)
- (Latvia) Vladimirs Volkovs (Daugava)
- (Sweden) Maic Sema (Haugesund)
- (Denmark) Christian Gytkjær (Haugesund)
- (Nigeria) Daniel Chima Chukwu (Molde)
- (Finland) Joona Toivio (Molde)
- (Norway) Eirik Hestad (Molde)
- (Norway) Tommy Høiland (Molde)
- (Norway) Even Hovland (Molde)
- (Norway) Fredrik Gulbrandsen (Molde)
- (Norway) Alexander Søderlund (Rosenborg)
- (Denmark) Tobias Mikkelsen (Rosenborg)
- (Norway) Stefan Strandberg (Rosenborg)
- (Denmark) Nicki Bille Nielsen (Rosenborg)
- (Hungary) Péter Kovács (Strømsgodset)
- (Kenya) Tokmac Nguen (Strømsgodset)
- (Denmark) Dennis Sørensen (Vestsjælland)
- (Denmark) Rasmus Festersen (Vestsjælland)
- (Denmark) Jan Kristiansen (Vestsjælland)
