= 2014 Molde FK season =

Molde
2014 season
- Chairman: Øystein Neerland
- Manager: Tor Ole Skullerud
- Stadium: Aker Stadion
- Tippeligaen: 1st (champions)
- Norwegian Cup: Winners
- Europa League: Third qualifying round vs Zorya Luhansk
- Top goalscorer: League: Mohamed Elyounoussi (13); All: Mohamed Elyounoussi (17)
- Highest home attendance: 11,424 vs Rosenborg (27 July 2014)
- Lowest home attendance: 3,682 vs Mjøndalen (27 June 2014)
- Average home league attendance: 8,296
Home colours	Away colours	Third colours

The 2014 season is Molde's seventh consecutive year in Tippeligaen, and their 38th season in the top flight of Norwegian football. It is their first season with Tor Ole Skullerud as their manager as Ole Gunnar Solskjær left the club on 2 January 2014 to join Cardiff City. Along with Tippeligaen, the club also competed in the Norwegian Cup and the Europa League were they entered in the second qualifying round.

== Squad ==
As of 9 August 2014

Note: Flags indicate national team as defined under FIFA eligibility rules; some limited exceptions apply. Players may hold more than one non-FIFA nationality.

No.	Pos.	Nation	Player
1	GK	NOR	Espen Bugge Pettersen
2	DF	SEN	Seydina Keita (on loan from Diambars FC)
3	MF	SEN	Amidou Diop
4	DF	NOR	Ruben Gabrielsen
5	DF	FIN	Joona Toivio
6	MF	NOR	Daniel Berg Hestad (Captain)
7	MF	NOR	Harmeet Singh
8	FW	NOR	Fredrik Gulbrandsen
9	MF	SWE	Mattias Moström
11	FW	ISL	Björn Bergmann Sigurðarson
12	GK	NOR	Ørjan Nyland
14	DF	NOR	Martin Linnes
15	DF	NOR	Per Egil Flo
16	MF	NOR	Etzaz Hussain

No.	Pos.	Nation	Player
18	DF	NOR	Magne Simonsen
19	MF	NOR	Eirik Hestad
20	FW	NOR	Tommy Høiland
21	MF	BRA	Agnaldo
22	MF	USA	Joshua Gatt
23	DF	NOR	Knut Olav Rindarøy
24	FW	NOR	Mohamed Elyounoussi
25	DF	NOR	Vegard Forren
27	FW	NGR	Daniel Chima Chukwu
29	FW	ENG	John Cofie
30	FW	SEN	Pape Paté Diouf
32	FW	NOR	Sander Svendsen
34	GK	USA	Ethan Horvath

=== Players on loan ===
Note: Flags indicate national team as defined under FIFA eligibility rules; some limited exceptions apply. Players may hold more than one non-FIFA nationality.

No.	Pos.	Nation	Player
31	FW	USA	Ben Spencer (at Indy Eleven)
33	MF	NOR	Andreas Hollingen (at HamKam)

No.	Pos.	Nation	Player
—	DF	NOR	Magnar Ødegaard (at Lillestrøm)
—	FW	SEN	Aliou Coly (at Kristiansund)

=== Reserve squad ===
Note: Flags indicate national team as defined under FIFA eligibility rules; some limited exceptions apply. Players may hold more than one non-FIFA nationality.

No.	Pos.	Nation	Player
37	DF	NOR	Ole Martin Rindarøy
38	MF	NOR	Stian Rode Gregersen
41	DF	NOR	Henrik Pettersen
42	MF	NOR	Eirik Haugan
43	FW	NOR	Mats Aambø
44	MF	NOR	Eskil Rønningen
45	MF	NOR	Sebastian Remme Berge
46	FW	NOR	Erik Frantzen
47	FW	NOR	Agwa Okuot Obiech

No.	Pos.	Nation	Player
48	FW	NOR	Jan Tidjani Aboubacar
49	FW	NOR	Alexander Jonassen
50	GK	NOR	Isak Gangeskar
51	GK	BRA	Neydson da Silva
52	FW	NOR	Erlend Hustad
53	MF	NOR	Ola Husby
54	MF	NOR	Kjetil Tøsse
55	DF	NOR	Kristian Strande
56	DF	NOR	Sebastian Larsson

== Transfers ==
=== In ===
Date	Position	Nationality	Name	From	Fee
19 February 2014	MF	(Norway)	Harmeet Singh	(Netherlands) Feyenoord	Free
15 March 2014	FW	(Norway)	Mohamed Elyounoussi	(Norway) Sarpsborg 08	
31 March 2014	FW	(Senegal)	Pape Paté Diouf	(Denmark) F.C. Copenhagen	
17 July 2014	DF	(Norway)	Ruben Gabrielsen	(Norway) Lillestrøm	
9 August 2014	FW	(England)	John Cofie	(England) Barnsley	Free
22 August 2014	MF	(Senegal)	Amidou Diop	(Senegal) Diambars FC	

=== Out ===
Date	Position	Nationality	Name	To	Fee
3 January 2014	GK	(Sweden)	Ole Söderberg	(Sweden) Kalmar FF	
11 January 2014	MF	(Norway)	Mats Møller Dæhli	(Wales) Cardiff City	Undisclosed
24 January 2014	FW	(Norway)	Jo Inge Berget	(Wales) Cardiff City	Undisclosed
10 February 2014	FW	(Norway)	Pål Erik Ulvestad	(Norway) Kristiansund	Undisclosed
13 March 2014	MF	(Norway)	Zlatko Tripić	(Norway) IK Start	
14 June 2014	DF	(Norway)	Even Hovland	(Germany) 1. FC Nürnberg	
14 July 2014	MF	(Nigeria)	Emmanuel Ekpo	(Norway) Haugesund	Free
18 July 2014	MF	(Norway)	Magnus Stamnestrø	(Norway) Kristiansund	
30 July 2014	MF	(Norway)	Magne Hoseth	(Norway) Stabæk	Free
5 August 2014	DF	(Norway)	Victor Johansen	(Norway) Lyn	Free
5 August 2014	MF	(Norway)	Ørjan Valstrand	(Norway) Byåsen	Free
12 August 2014	GK	(Norway)	Ola Herman Opheim	(Norway) Kristiansund	
13 August 2014	DF	(Norway)	Ivar Furu	(Norway) Ranheim	

=== Loans in ===
Date from	Date to	Position	Nationality	Name	From
31 January 2014	Season-long	FW	(Iceland)	Björn Bergmann Sigurðarson	(England) Wolverhampton Wanderers
22 August 2014	Remaining season	DF	(Senegal)	Seydina Keita	(Senegal) Diambars FC

=== Loans out ===
Date from	Date to	Position	Nationality	Name	To
July 2013	Season long	DF	(Norway)	Magnar Ødegaard	(Norway) Lillestrøm
29 November 2013	18 July 2014	MF	(Norway)	Magnus Stamnestrø	(Norway) Kristiansund
18 February 2014	Season long	FW	(Senegal)	Aliou Coly	(Norway) Kristiansund
12 March 2014	Season long	FW	(United States)	Ben Spencer	(United States) Indy Eleven
13 March 2014	12 August 2014	DF	(Norway)	Ivar Furu	(Iceland) KR
31 March 2014	8 July 2014	FW	(Norway)	Tommy Høiland	(Norway) Lillestrøm
1 April 2014	1 August	GK	(Norway)	Ola Herman Opheim	(Norway) Nardo
10 August 2014	Remaining season	MF	(Norway)	Andreas Hollingen	(Norway) HamKam

=== Released ===
Date	Position	Nationality	Name	Joined	Date
9 November 2013	DF	(Norway)	Børre Steenslid	Retired	

== Friendlies ==
27 January 2014 Copa del Sol	AIK (Sweden)	1–4	(Norway) Molde	Spain
17:00 CET (UTC+1)	Backman 57'	Summary	Chima Chukwu 22'; Toivio 45'; E. Hestad 51'; Høiland 90+2'

31 January 2014 Copa del Sol	Molde (Norway)	2–1	(Denmark) Vestsjælland	Spain
20:00 CET (UTC+1)	Hovland 57'; Gulbrandsen 10'	Summary	Kristiansen 54'

3 February 2014 Copa del Sol	Molde (Norway)	2–0	(Angola) Benfica (Luanda)	Spain
20:00 CET (UTC+1)	Hoseth 45+2' (pen.); Toivio 57'	Summary

11 February 2014 Friendly	Molde	1–1	Kristiansund	Molde
18:00 CET (UTC+1)	Hoseth 4'	Summary	Rødsand 88'	Stadium: Aker Stadion

14 February 2014 Friendly	Molde	1–1	Ranheim	Molde
15:00 CET (UTC+1)	Hoseth 12' (pen.)	Summary	Åsen 57'	Stadium: Aker Stadion

25 February 2014 Friendly	CSKA Moscow (Russia)	1–1	(Norway) Molde	Marbella, Spain
14:00 CET (UTC+1)	Bazelyuk 79'	Summary	Agnaldo 78'

27 February 2014 Friendly	Lokomotiv Moscow (Russia)	1–0	(Norway) Molde	Marbella, Spain
19:00 CET (UTC+1)	Samedov 10' (pen.)	Summary

8 March 2014 Friendly	Molde	4–4	Sogndal	Molde
15:00 CET (UTC+1)	P. Flo 60'; Moström 66'; Høiland 80', (penalty missed) 90'; Chima Chukwu 83'	Summary	Mané 17' (pen.); U. Flo 24', 34'; Holsæter 72'	Stadium: Aker Stadion

14 March 2014 Friendly	Lillestrøm	1–1	Molde	Lillestrøm
16:00 CET (UTC+1)	Pálmason 17'	Summary	Sigurðarson 76'	Stadium: LSK-Hallen

22 March 2014 Friendly	Molde	3–1	Aalesund	Molde
15:00 CET (UTC+1)	Elyounoussi 39'; O. Lie 40' (o.g.); Høiland 80'	Summary	Nyland 86' (o.g.)	Stadium: Aker Stadion; Attendance: 1,295

== Competitions ==
=== Tippeligaen ===
==== Results summary ====
Overall								Home						Away					
Pld	W	D	L	GF	GA	GD	Pts	W	D	L	GF	GA	GD	W	D	L	GF	GA	GD
30	22	5	3	62	24	+38	71	12	2	1	40	14	+26	10	3	2	22	10	+12

==== Results by round ====
Round	1	2	3	4	5	6	7	8	9	10	11	12	13	14	15	16	17	18	19	20	21	22	23	24	25	26	27	28	29	30
Ground	H	A	A	H	A	H	A	H	A	H	A	H	A	H	A	H	H	A	H	A	H	A	H	A	H	A	H	A	A	H
Result	W	L	W	W	W	W	W	D	W	W	D	W	D	W	W	W	W	D	D	W	W	W	W	W	W	W	L	W	L	W
Position	4	6	2	2	2	1	1	1	1	1	1	1	1	1	1	1	1	1	1	1	1	1	1	1	1	1	1	1	1	1

Updated to match(es) played on 10 November 2014. Source: see below
A = Away; H = Home; W = Win; D = Draw; L = Loss

==== Fixtures ====
28 March 2014 1	Molde	2–0	Vålerenga	Molde
19:00 CEST (UTC+1)	Forren 22'; Sigurðarson 29'; Hestad (yellow card) 68'	Summary	Gunnarsson (yellow card) 14'	Stadium: Aker Stadion; Attendance: 8,875; Referee: Tom Harald Hagen

5 April 2014 2	Odd	2–1	Molde	Skien
15:30 CEST (UTC+2)	Rashani 50'; Samuelsen 53'; Halvorsen (yellow card) 90+2'	Summary	Hestad 41'; Moström (yellow card) 69'; Flo (yellow card) 75'	Stadium: Skagerak Arena; Attendance: 6,140; Referee: Trond Ivar Døvle

13 April 2014 3	Stabæk	0–2	Molde	Bærum
15:30 CEST (UTC+2)		Summary	Sigurðarson 22'; Forren (yellow card) 48'; Chukwu 84'	Stadium: Nadderud Stadion; Attendance: 4,609; Referee: Espen Berntsen

21 April 2014 4	Molde	5–1	Sarpsborg 08	Molde
18:00 CEST (UTC+2)	Gulbrandsen 25', 64'; Elyounoussi 60', 90+3'; Svendsen 89'	Summary	Olanare 20'	Stadium: Aker Stadion; Attendance: 8,870; Referee: Brage Sandmoen

27 April 2014 5	Sandnes Ulf	1–3	Molde	Sandnes
18:00 CEST (UTC+2)	Forren 83' (o.g.)	Summary	Moström 14'; Gulbrandsen 43'; Elyounoussi 90'	Stadium: Sandnes Idrettspark; Attendance: 3,050; Referee: Ken Henry Johnsen

1 May 2014 6	Molde	2–0	Start	Molde
18:00 CEST (UTC+2)	Gulbrandsen 44'; Ekpo (yellow card) 45+1'; Chukwu 55'	Summary	Asante (yellow card) 24'; Tripić (yellow card) 34'; Berger (yellow card) 58'	Stadium: Aker Stadion; Attendance: 9,085; Referee: Svein Oddvar Moen

4 May 2014 7	Rosenborg	0–2	Molde	Trondheim
18:00 CEST (UTC+2)	Skjelvik (yellow card) 63'	Summary	Gulbrandsen 30' (yellow card) 59'; Flo 87'	Stadium: Lerkendal Stadion; Attendance: 18,227; Referee: Tore Hansen

11 May 2014 8	Molde	2–2	Strømsgodset	Molde
19:00 CEST (UTC+2)	Elyounoussi 28', 79'; Forren (yellow card) 90+1'	Summary	Vilsvik (yellow card) 10'; Júnior (yellow card) 36'; Høibråten (yellow card) 54'; Kovács 66', 90+1'	Stadium: Aker Stadion; Attendance: 10,030; Referee: Svein Erik Edvartsen

16 May 2014 9	Lillestrøm	1–2	Molde	Oslo
18:00 CEST (UTC+2)	Gabrielsen 17' (yellow card) 90+4'; Knudtzon (yellow card) 66'	Summary	Chukwu 14'; Hestad (yellow card) 39'; Hovland 42'; Singh (yellow card) 90+3'	Stadium: Åråsen Stadion; Attendance: 10,965; Referee: Tom Harald Hagen

20 May 2014 10	Molde	1–0	Viking	Molde
18:00 CEST (UTC+2)	Elyounoussi 90+3'	Summary		Stadium: Aker Stadion; Attendance: 8,847; Referee: Dag Vidar Hafsås

23 May 2014 11	Haugesund	1–1	Molde	Haugesund
19:00 CEST (UTC+2)	Stølås 86'	Summary	Linnes 49'; Hussain (yellow card) 59'	Stadium: Haugesund Stadion; Attendance: 5,311; Referee: Ola Hobber Nilsen

9 June 2014 12	Molde	4–2	Brann	Molde
18:00 CEST (UTC+2)	Elyounoussi 14', 45', 68' (pen.); Gulbrandsen 79'	Summary	Askar 20', 26'; El Fakiri (yellow card) 87'	Stadium: Aker Stadion; Attendance: 9,837; Referee: Tom Harald Hagen

12 June 2014 13	Bodø/Glimt	1–1	Molde	Bodø
18:00 CEST (UTC+2)	Brix (yellow card) 36'; O.M.Rindarøy 61' (o.g.)	Summary	Toivio 15'; Gulbrandsen (yellow card) 64'	Stadium: Aspmyra Stadion; Attendance: 3,305; Referee: Ola Hobber Nilsen

5 July 2014 14	Molde	3–0	Sogndal	Molde
15:30 CEST (UTC+2)	Chukwu 11'; Valsvik 33' (o.g.); Linnes 79'	Summary		Stadium: Aker Stadion; Attendance: 8,786; Referee: Trond Ivar Døvle

11 July 2014 15	Aalesund	0–1	Molde	Ålesund
19:00 CEST (UTC+2)	Latifu (yellow card) 48'	Summary	Chukwu (yellow card) 14'; Forren 33'; Singh (yellow card) 62'	Stadium: Color Line Stadion; Attendance: 9,386; Referee: Tommy Skjerven

20 July 2014 16	Molde	3–1	Sandnes Ulf	Molde
15:30 CEST (UTC+2)	Høiland 27', 64', 73'	Summary	Midtsjø 5'; Skjølsvik (yellow card) 25' (yellow-red card) 62'	Stadium: Aker Stadion; Attendance: 8,821; Referee: Anders Johansen

27 July 2014 17	Molde	3–1	Rosenborg	Molde
18:00 CEST (UTC+2)	Moström 4' (yellow card) 34'; Singh (yellow card) 41' (goal) 63'; Chukwu 55'; Hestad (yellow card) 80'	Summary	Pedersen 75'	Stadium: Aker Stadion; Attendance: 11,424; Referee: Svein Oddvar Moen

3 August 2014 18	Start	1–1	Molde	Kristiansand
18:00 CEST (UTC+2)	Hoff 74'	Summary	Gulbrandsen (yellow card) 20'; Chukwu 72'	Stadium: Sør Arena; Attendance: 5,565; Referee: Trygve Kjensli

10 August 2014 19	Molde	2–2	Stabæk	Molde
15:30 CEST (UTC+2)	Høiland 12' (yellow card) 47'; Elyounoussi 37'; Hussain (yellow card) 77'	Summary	Trondsen (yellow card) 10'; Næss (yellow card) 41'; Stephens 56'; Boli 89'; Jacobson (yellow card) 90+3'	Stadium: Aker Stadion; Attendance: 8,284; Referee: Dag Vidar Hafsås

17 August 2014 20	Sarpsborg 08	0–2	Molde	Sarpsborg
18:00 CEST (UTC+2)	Hansen (yellow card) 37'	Summary	Forren 48' (yellow card) 55'; Høiland 76'	Stadium: Sarpsborg Stadion; Attendance: 3,778; Referee: Tore Hansen

24 August 2014 21	Molde	5–0	Aalesund	Molde
19:00 CEST (UTC+2)	Gulbrandsen 15'; Linnes 22', 31'; Chukwu 80', 90'	Summary	Barrantes (yellow card) 54'	Stadium: Aker Stadion; Attendance: 9,586; Referee: Espen Berntsen

31 August 2014 22	Brann	0–1	Molde	Bergen
19:00 CEST (UTC+2)	Grønner (yellow card) 40'	Summary	Forren 32'; Moström (yellow card) 80'	Stadium: Brann Stadion; Attendance: 15,240; Referee: Tom Harald Hagen

14 September 2014 23	Molde	3–2	Lillestrøm	Molde
19:00 CEST (UTC+2)	Gulbrandsen 10'; Elyounoussi 12', 62'	Summary	Andersson (yellow card) 44'; Pálmason 47'; Moen 60' (yellow card) 74'	Stadium: Aker Stadion; Attendance: 9,932; Referee: Dag Vidar Hafsås

20 September 2014 24	Vålerenga	0–2	Molde	Oslo
18:00 CEST (UTC+2)		Summary	Chukwu 22'; Forren (yellow card) 43'; Gulbrandsen 69'	Stadium: Ullevaal Stadion; Attendance: 9,173; Referee: Tore Hansen

27 September 2014 25	Molde	2–1	Bodø/Glimt	Molde
15:30 CEST (UTC+2)	Gulbrandsen 12'; Singh (yellow card) 24' (goal) 79' (pen.); Høiland (yellow card) 90+4'	Summary	Londak (red card) 77'; Chatto (yellow card) 90+3'	Stadium: Aker Stadion; Attendance: 8,411; Referee: Ken Henry Johnsen

4 October 2014 26	Viking	1–2	Molde	Stavanger
18:00 CEST (UTC+2)	Nisja 8'; Danielsen (yellow card) 45+1'; Østbø (yellow card) 62'; Haugen (yellow card) 87'	Summary	Flo (yellow card) 30'; Singh (yellow card) 45+1' (goal) 63' (pen.); Hussain (yellow card) 46'; Sigurðarson 78'	Stadium: Viking Stadion; Attendance: 7,730; Referee: Omar Rafiq

18 October 2014 27	Molde	1–2	Haugesund	Molde
18:00 CEST (UTC+2)	Hestad (yellow card) 62'; Chukwu 90+1'	Summary	Cvetinović (yellow card) 16'; Stølås 53'; Skjerve (yellow card) 56'; Sema 67'	Stadium: Aker Stadion; Attendance: 8,362; Referee: Espen Berntsen

26 October 2014 28	Sogndal	0–1	Molde	Sogndalsfjøra
18:00 CEST (UTC+2)		Summary	Elyounoussi 35'; Gabrielsen (yellow card) 60'	Stadium: Fosshaugane Campus; Attendance: 3,763; Referee: Trond Ivar Døvle

2 November 2014 29	Strømsgodset	2–0	Molde	Drammen
18:00 CEST (UTC+2)	Horn (yellow card) 52'; Storflor 61', 68'; Ogunjimi (yellow card) 73'; Adjei-Boateng (yellow card) 86'	Summary	Singh (yellow card) 86'	Stadium: Marienlyst Stadion; Attendance: 6,880; Referee: Anders Johansen

9 November 2014 30	Molde	2–0	Odd	Molde
18:00 CEST (UTC+2)	Hussain 70'; Gulbrandsen (yellow card) 73'; Chukwu 75' (yellow card) 78'; Høiland (yellow card) 80'	Summary	Hagen (yellow card) 59'; Jensen (yellow card) 73'	Stadium: Aker Stadion; Attendance: 9,500; Referee: Espen Berntsen

==== Table ====
Pos	Team	Pld	W	D	L	GF	GA	GD	Pts	Qualification or relegation
1	Molde (C)	30	22	5	3	62	24	+38	71	Qualification for the Champions League second qualifying round
2	Rosenborg	30	18	6	6	64	43	+21	60	Qualification for the Europa League first qualifying round (Note: Since the winners of the 2014 Norwegian Cup (Molde) qualified for European competition based on their league position, the berth (Europa League first qualifying round) was passed down the league to Strømsgodset.)
3	Odd	30	17	7	6	52	32	+20	58	Qualification for the Europa League first qualifying round
4	Strømsgodset	30	15	5	10	48	42	+6	50	Qualification for the Europa League first qualifying round
5	Lillestrøm	30	13	7	10	49	35	+14	46	

Source: fotball.no
Rules for classification: 1) points; 2) goal difference; 3) number of goals scored.
(C) Champions

=== Norwegian Cup ===
24 April 2014 First Round	Surnadal	0–9	Molde	Surnadal
18:00 CEST (UTC+2)		Summary	Svendsen 20', 64', 75'; Diouf 39', 57', 66', 85'; Agnaldo 60'; Hollingen 82'	Stadium: Syltøran Stadion; Attendance: 850; Referee: Mathias Smehus Kringstad

7 May 2014 Second Round	Strindheim	0–1	Molde	Trondheim
18:00 CEST (UTC+2)	S.Stokke (yellow card) 81'	Summary	Hussain (yellow card) 56'; Chukwu 90+3'	Stadium: Strindheim Kunstgress; Attendance: 112; Referee: Kim Rune Borgersen

4 June 2014 Third Round	Florø	1–2	Molde	Florø
18:00 CEST (UTC+2)	E.Hove (yellow card) 5'; S.Aase 25'; A.Reksten (yellow card) 81'; C.Husa (yellow card) 90+2'	Summary	Toivio 8'; Hestad 61'	Stadium: Florø Stadion; Attendance: 2,150; Referee: Tommy Skjerven

27 June 2014 Fourth Round	Molde	4–1	Mjøndalen	Molde
19:00 CEST (UTC+2)	Gulbrandsen 11'; Elyounoussi 31'; Chukwu 41', 79'	Summary	J.Olsen (yellow card) 41'; M.Gundersen (yellow card) 84'; M.Bakken 88'	Stadium: Aker Stadion; Attendance: 3,682; Referee: Trygve Kjensli

13 August 2014 Quarter-finals	Molde	5–1	Viking	Molde
20:00 CEST (UTC+2)	Chukwu 14'; Hestad (yellow card) 29'; Elyounoussi 40'; Moström 50'; Flo 58'; Gulbrandsen 68'	Summary	Sigurðsson (yellow card) 16' de Lanlay 32'	Stadium: Aker Stadion; Attendance: 5,015; Referee: Tommy Skjerven

24 September 2014 Semi-finals	Stabæk	0–1	Molde	Bærum
20:00 CEST (UTC+2)		Summary	Elyounoussi 86'	Stadium: Nadderud Stadion; Attendance: 4,938; Referee: Tom Harald Hagen

==== Final ====
23 November 2014	Molde	2–0	Odd	Oslo
13:15 CET (UTC+1)	Elyounoussi (yellow card) 60', (goal) 88'; Gulbrandsen (yellow card) 65', (goal) 73'	Summary	Hurme (yellow card) 58'; Samuelsen (yellow card) 69'	Stadium: Ullevaal Stadion; Attendance: 26,528; Referee: Dag Vidar Hafsås

=== UEFA Europa League ===
==== Qualifying rounds ====
17 July 2014 Second qualifying round 1st leg	Molde (Norway)	4–1	(Slovenia) Gorica	Molde, Norway
20:30 CEST (UTC+2)	Toivio 16'; Forren 37', 41' (pen.); Hussain (yellow card) 43'; Hoseth 88'	Report	Žigon (yellow card) 20'; Jogan (yellow card) 41'; Majcen 70' (pen.) (yellow card) 90+2'; Vetrih (yellow card) 86'	Stadium: Aker Stadion; Attendance: 5,837; Referee: Padraigh Sutton (Republic of Ireland)

24 July 2014 Second qualifying round 2nd leg	Gorica (Slovenia)	1–1 (2–5 agg.)	(Norway) Molde	Nova Gorica, Slovenia
20:30 CEST (UTC+2)	Modolo (yellow card) 54'; Jogan 63'; Vetrih (red card) 79'; Enow (yellow card) 80'; Kavčič (yellow card) 87'	Summary	Hussain (yellow card) 27'; Agnaldo 49'; Nyland (yellow card) 72'; Linnes (yellow card) 79'; Svendsen (yellow card) 90'	Stadium: Nova Gorica Sports Park; Attendance: 607; Referee: Carlos Xistra (Portugal)

31 July 2014 Third qualifying round 1st leg	Zorya Luhansk (Ukraine)	1–1	(Norway) Molde	Kyiv, Ukraine
19:30 CEST (UTC+2)	Khudzik (yellow card) 15'; Kamenyuka 62'	Report	Toivio (yellow card) 23'; Chukwu (yellow card) 31'; Hestad (yellow card) 85'; Svendsen 89'	Stadium: Valeriy Lobanovskyi Dynamo Stadium; Attendance: 3,250; Referee: Harald Lechner (Austria)

7 August 2014 Third qualifying round 2nd leg	Molde (Norway)	1–2 (2–3 agg.)	(Ukraine) Zorya Luhansk	Molde, Norway
18:00 CEST (UTC+2)	Gulbrandsen 43'	Report	Kamenyuka 2'; Ignjatijević (yellow card) 38'; Malinovskyi (yellow card) 46'; Hrytsay (yellow card) 59'; Bilyi (yellow card) 87'; Lipartia (yellow card) 87'; Forren 89' (o.g.)	Stadium: Aker Stadion; Attendance: 4,438; Referee: Steven McLean (Scotland)

== Squad statistics ==
As of Match played 23 November 2014

=== Appearances and goals ===
No.	Pos	Nat	Player	Total		Tippeligaen		Norwegian Cup		Europa League	
No.	Pos	Nat	Player	Apps	Goals	Apps	Goals	Apps	Goals	Apps	Goals
1	GK	(Norway) NOR	Espen Bugge Pettersen	3	0	2+1	0	0	0	0	0
3	MF	(Senegal) SEN	Amidou Diop	1	0	0+1	0	0	0	0	0
4	DF	(Norway) NOR	Ruben Gabrielsen	12	0	7+3	0	1	0	1	0
5	DF	(Finland) FIN	Joona Toivio	33	3	19+3	1	7	1	4	1
6	MF	(Norway) NOR	Daniel Berg Hestad	33	2	14+11	1	4+1	1	2+1	0
7	MF	(Norway) NOR	Harmeet Singh	37	3	27+1	3	5	0	4	0
8	FW	(Norway) NOR	Fredrik Gulbrandsen	29	14	19+4	10	3+2	3	1	1
9	MF	(Sweden) SWE	Mattias Moström	35	3	26+2	3	5	0	2	0
11	FW	(Iceland) ISL	Björn Bergmann Sigurðarson	17	3	9+6	3	0+2	0	0	0
12	GK	(Norway) NOR	Ørjan Nyland	37	0	28	0	5	0	4	0
14	DF	(Norway) NOR	Martin Linnes	38	4	28	4	5+1	0	3+1	0
15	DF	(Norway) NOR	Per Egil Flo	32	2	20+4	1	4	1	4	0
16	MF	(Norway) NOR	Etzaz Hussain	27	1	14+5	1	3+3	0	2	0
18	DF	(Norway) NOR	Magne Simonsen	5	0	2+1	0	2	0	0	0
19	MF	(Norway) NOR	Eirik Hestad	10	0	6+2	0	0+1	0	0+1	0
20	FW	(Norway) NOR	Tommy Høiland	15	5	2+7	5	1+2	0	1+2	0
21	FW	(Brazil) BRA	Agnaldo	24	2	6+10	0	3+1	1	3+1	1
23	DF	(Norway) NOR	Knut Olav Rindarøy	10	0	6+1	0	2	0	0+1	0
24	FW	(Norway) NOR	Mohamed Elyounoussi	37	17	28+2	13	4	4	2+1	0
25	DF	(Norway) NOR	Vegard Forren	37	6	27	4	6	0	4	2
27	FW	(Nigeria) NGR	Daniel Chima Chukwu	36	15	24+3	11	5+1	4	3	0
30	FW	(Senegal) SEN	Pape Paté Diouf	14	4	1+6	0	3+1	4	3	0
32	FW	(Norway) NOR	Sander Svendsen	17	5	1+11	1	2+1	3	0+2	1
34	GK	(United States) USA	Ethan Horvath	2	0	0	0	2	0	0	0
37	DF	(Norway) NOR	Ole Martin Rindarøy	5	0	2	0	0+2	0	0+1	0
42	MF	(Norway) NOR	Eirik Haugan	1	0	0	0	0+1	0	0	0
Players away from Molde on loan:
33	MF	(Norway) NOR	Andreas Hollingen	2	1	0	0	0+2	1	0	0
Players who appeared for Molde no longer at the club:
4	DF	(Norway) NOR	Even Hovland	10	1	9	1	1	0	0	0
10	MF	(Norway) NOR	Magne Hoseth	9	1	1+4	0	2	0	1+1	1
29	MF	(Nigeria) NGR	Emmanuel Ekpo	4	0	1+1	0	2	0	0	0

=== Goal scorers ===
Rank	Pos.	No.	Player	Tippeligaen	Norwegian Cup	Europa League	Total
1	FW	24	(Norway) Mohamed Elyounoussi	13	4	0	17
2	FW	27	(Nigeria) Daniel Chima Chukwu	11	4	0	15
3	FW	8	(Norway) Fredrik Gulbrandsen	10	3	1	14
4	DF	25	(Norway) Vegard Forren	4	0	2	6
5	FW	20	(Norway) Tommy Høiland	5	0	0	5
5	FW	32	(Norway) Sander Svendsen	1	3	1	5
7	DF	14	(Norway) Martin Linnes	4	0	0	4
7	FW	30	(Senegal) Pape Paté Diouf	0	4	0	4
9	MF	7	(Norway) Harmeet Singh	3	0	0	3
9	FW	11	(Iceland) Björn Bergmann Sigurðarson	3	0	0	3
9	DF	5	(Finland) Joona Toivio	1	1	1	3
9	MF	9	(Sweden) Mattias Moström	2	1	0	3
13	MF	6	(Norway) Daniel Berg Hestad	1	1	0	2
13	DF	15	(Norway) Per Egil Flo	1	1	0	2
13	MF	21	(Brazil) Agnaldo	0	1	1	2
16	DF	4	(Norway) Even Hovland	1	0	0	1
16	MF	16	(Norway) Etzaz Hussain	1	0	0	1
16	MF	33	(Norway) Andreas Hollingen	0	1	0	1
16	MF	10	(Norway) Magne Hoseth	0	0	1	1
Own goal				1	0	0	1
TOTALS				62	24	7	93

=== Disciplinary record ===
Number	Nation	Position	Name	Tippeligaen		Norwegian Cup		Europa League		Total	
Number	Nation	Position	Name	Yellow card	Red card	Yellow card	Red card	Yellow card	Red card	Yellow card	Red card
4	(Norway)	DF	Ruben Gabrielsen	1	0	0	0	0	0	1	0
5	(Finland)	DF	Joona Toivio	0	0	0	0	1	0	1	0
6	(Norway)	MF	Daniel Berg Hestad	3	0	1	0	1	0	5	0
7	(Norway)	MF	Harmeet Singh	6	0	0	0	0	0	6	0
8	(Norway)	FW	Fredrik Gulbrandsen	4	0	1	0	0	0	5	0
9	(Sweden)	MF	Mattias Moström	3	0	0	0	0	0	3	0
12	(Norway)	GK	Ørjan Nyland	0	0	0	0	1	0	1	0
14	(Norway)	DF	Martin Linnes	0	0	0	0	1	0	1	0
15	(Norway)	DF	Per Egil Flo	2	0	0	0	0	0	2	0
16	(Norway)	MF	Etzaz Hussain	3	0	1	0	2	0	6	0
19	(Norway)	MF	Eirik Hestad	1	0	0	0	0	0	1	0
20	(Norway)	FW	Tommy Høiland	3	0	0	0	0	0	3	0
24	(Norway)	FW	Mohamed Elyounoussi	0	0	1	0	0	0	1	0
25	(Norway)	DF	Vegard Forren	4	0	0	0	0	0	4	0
27	(Nigeria)	FW	Daniel Chima Chukwu	2	0	0	0	1	0	3	0
29	(Nigeria)	MF	Emmanuel Ekpo	1	0	0	0	0	0	1	0
32	(Norway)	FW	Sander Svendsen	0	0	0	0	1	0	1	0
			TOTALS	33	0	4	0	8	0	45	0

== See also ==
- Molde FK seasons

== Notes ==
Notes

1. The match was played at Valeriy Lobanovskyi Dynamo Stadium, Kyiv instead of Zorya Luhansk's home stadium, Avanhard Stadium, Luhansk, due to the war in Donbas.
