= Johannes Nordström =

Finnish footballer (born 1993)

Personal information
- Full name: Johannes Nordström
- Date of birth: 23 January 1993 (age 33)
- Place of birth: Örebro, Sweden
- Height: 6 ft 0 in (1.83 m)
- Position: Defender

Team information
- Current team: FC Åland

Youth career
- IFK Mariehamn

Senior career*
Years	Team	Apps	(Gls)
2010–2012	IFK Mariehamn	14	(0)
2013	Eskilstuna City FK	19	(3)
2014	Nacka FF	17	(2)
2015	Vasalunds IF	16	(0)
2016–	FC Åland	0	(0)

International career^{‡}
2011	Finland U-19	3	(0)
- * Club domestic league appearances and goals as of 29 january 2016 ‡ National team caps and goals as of 10 November 2011

Johannes Nordström (born 23 January 1993) is a Finnish footballer, currently playing as a defender at FC Åland. He hails from Åland, an autonomous region of Finland, but was born in Örebro, Sweden.

== Career ==
Nordström played his first league match for IFK Mariehamn away at MYPA in October 2010. Even though he's primarily known as a central defender, he played the position of full back for 90 minutes in this match.

In January 2011, Nordström was a part of the U-18 team of Finland that drew with Russia and beat Italy 3–0 in an international tournament. Nordström was chosen to be team captain, and featured in both matches for 90 minutes as a central defender. He also played in the final, where Finland managed to beat China 2–0.
