= Marko Nikolić (footballer, born 1997) =

Swedish footballer

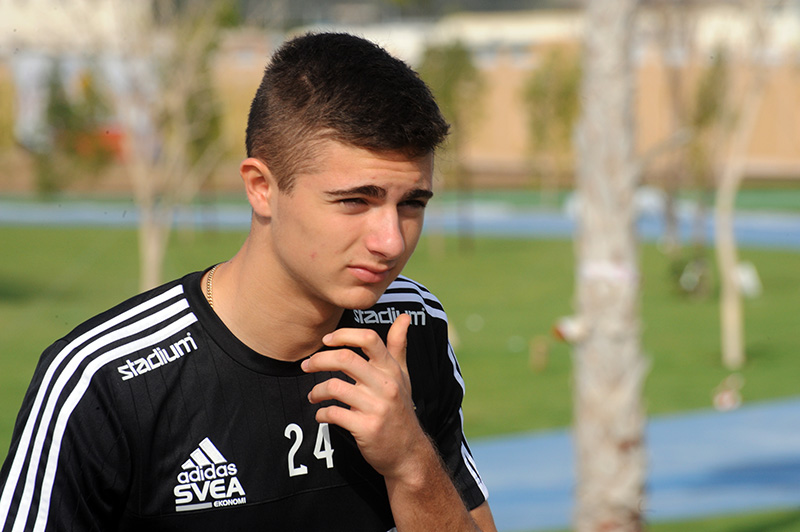
- Marko with AIK in 2015

Personal information
- Full name: Marko Nikolić
- Date of birth: 17 September 1997 (age 29)
- Place of birth: Huddinge, Sweden
- Height: 1.83 m (6 ft 0 in)
- Position: Attacking midfielder

Team information
- Current team: Vasalund IF
- Number: 10

Youth career
- –2012: IFK Haninge
- 2013: Djurgårdens IF

Senior career*
| Years | Team | Apps | (Gls) |
| 2014–2016 | AIK | 22 | (2) |
| 2016 | → Syrianska (loan) | 6 | (1) |
| 2017 | Westerlo | 1 | (0) |
| 2017–2018 | IF Brommapojkarna | 18 | (1) |
| 2019–2021 | Vasalund IF | 48 | (17) |
| 2021–2023 | Jönköpings Södra | 81 | (12) |
| 2024– | Vasalund IF | 67 | (17) |

International career
| 2014 | Sweden U17 | 6 | (1) |
| 2014–2016 | Sweden U19 | 14 | (2) |
- * Club domestic league appearances and goals as of 10 November 2026

Marko Nikolić (born 17 September 1997) is a Swedish footballer who plays for Vasalund IF as an attacking midfielder.

== Career ==
He made his debut in Allsvenskan for AIK 7 July 2014 as a 16-year-old against Åtvidabergs FF. After 3 years in AIK he signed a 6 month contract with K.V.C. Westerlo, but due to the injury he played only one match. After a short episode in K.V.C. Westerlo, he played two seasons for IF Brommapojkarna. Nikolic left IF Brommapojkarna at the end of 2018.

In February 2019, Nikolić signed for Vasalund IF. He won the Ettan Midfielder of the Year award of 2020. In January 2021, Nikolić moved to Jönköpings Södra, where he signed a three-year contract.

== Statistics ==
| Club | Season | Division | League | | Svenska Cupen | | Europe | | Total | |
| Club | Season | Division | Apps | Goals | Apps | Goals | Apps | Goals | Apps | Goals |
|---|---|---|---|---|---|---|---|---|---|---|
| AIK | 2014 | Allsvenskan | 9 | 0 | 1 | 1 | 1 | 0 | 11 | 1 |
| AIK | 2015 | Allsvenskan | 7 | 0 | 1 | 0 | 2 | 0 | 10 | 0 |
| AIK | 2016 | Allsvenskan | 0 | 0 | 1 | 1 | 0 | 0 | 1 | 1 |
| Syrianska FC (loan) | 2016 | Superettan | 7 | 1 | 0 | 0 | — | | 7 | 1 |
| IF Brommapojkarna | 2017 | Superettan | 6 | 0 | 0 | 0 | — | | 6 | 0 |
| IF Brommapojkarna | 2018 | Allsvenskan | 10 | 0 | 2 | 1 | — | | 12 | 1 |
| Vasalund IF | 2019 | Division 1 | 30 | 7 | 0 | 0 | — | | 30 | 7 |
| Vasalund IF | 2020 | Division 1 | 13 | 9 | 1 | 1 | — | | 12 | 8 |
| Career totals | | | 82 | 17 | 6 | 4 | 3 | 0 | 89 | 19 |
