= Nabil Bahoui =

Swedish-born Moroccan professional footballer

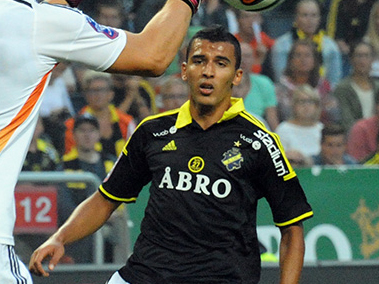

Personal information
- Date of birth: 5 February 1991 (age 35)
- Place of birth: Stockholm, Sweden
- Height: 1.88 m (6 ft 2 in)
- Positions: Forward; winger

Youth career
- 1996: Mälarhöjdens IK
- 2003–2007: IF Brommapojkarna

Senior career*
Years	Team	Apps	(Gls)
2008–2012	IF Brommapojkarna	56	(17)
2009–2010	→ Gröndals IK (loan)	4	(1)
2010	→ Väsby United (loan)	8	(1)
2011	→ Akropolis IF (loan)	3	(0)
2013–2015	AIK	64	(26)
2015–2016	Al-Ahli	10	(0)
2016–2017	Hamburger SV	7	(0)
2017	Hamburger SV II	1	(0)
2017–2019	Grasshoppers	29	(3)
2018	→ AIK (loan)	11	(3)
2019	De Graafschap	7	(0)
2019–2022	AIK	75	(22)
2023	Qatar SC	8	(0)
2023–2024	Persepolis	8	(1)
2025–2026	IF Brommapojkarna	14	(0)

International career
2010	Sweden U19	1	(0)
2014–2015	Sweden	8	(0)
- * Club domestic league appearances and goals as of 24 March 2026

Nabil Bahoui (Swedish pronunciation: [naˈbɪlː bahʊˈiː]; Arabic: نبيل بحوي; born 5 February 1991) is a Swedish former professional footballer who last played as a forward for Allsvenskan club IF Brommapojkarna.

== Club career ==
=== IF Brommapojkarna ===
In 2008, Bahoui joined the main team of IF Brommapojkarna. Where he was able to appear effective and attract the attention of media. He was a key player of the team in many competitions.

He was also loaned to Gröndals IK, AFC Eskilstuna and Akropolis IF.

=== AIK ===
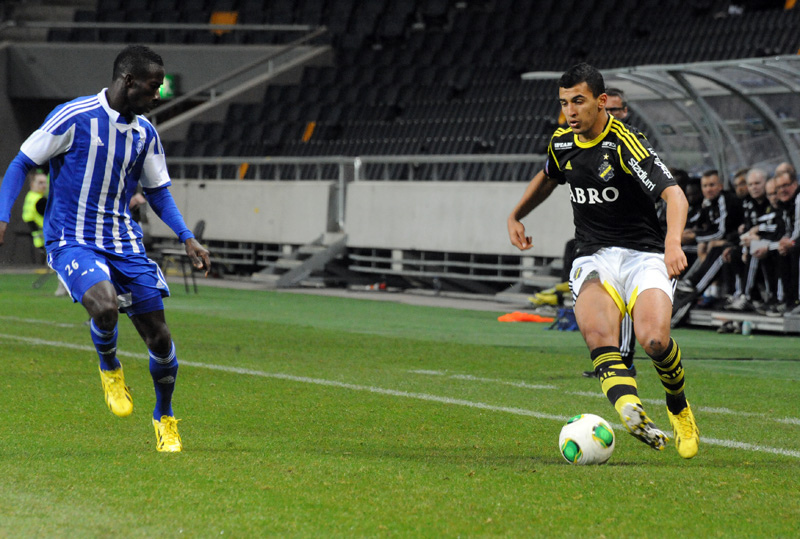
Bahoui playing against HJK Helsinki in 2014

On 8 November 2012, it was announced that Bahoui had signed a 3.5-year contract with AIK. He chose at first number 14. However, due to an agreement with fellow midfielder Lalawélé Atakora, who at the time was wearing number 11, he got to switch from 14 to 11.

His first and early full season in the Allsvenskan has been considered exceptional, using his attacking abilities to score and find best chances, helped AIK to fight with Malmo for the league title. He was one of the most influential and key players of his team in this era.

=== Al-Ahli ===
In 2015, he joined Al-Ahli Saudi Football Club. Later, the club negotiated a replacement for him and both sides decided not to continue the cooperation. After negotiations, he parted ways with Al-Ahli.

=== Hamburger SV ===
He joined Hamburger SV in 2016. Where he played few matches and his contract was not renewed.

=== Grasshopper Club Zürich ===
In 2017, Bahoui signed a three-year contract with Grasshopper Club Zürich.

=== AIK (loan) ===
In 2018, he loaned to AIK and played a key role for the team.

=== De Graafschap ===
He joined De Graafschap in 2019 and played few matches for the club.

=== Return to AIK ===
In 2019, Bahoui joined AIK Fotboll with a new contract.

=== Qatar SC ===
In 2023, Bahoui has signed for Qatar Stars League club Qatar SC. He left the club after playing 8 league matches.

=== Persepolis ===
On 12 September 2023, Bahoui signed a one-year contract with Persian Gulf Pro League champions Persepolis. On 19 October 2023, He made his debut in a 3–1 away win against Paykan.

== International career ==
On 26 August 2014, Nabil was picked out in the Sweden national team to play a friendly game against Estonia and he was also in the squad when Sweden played against Austria in the 2016 European Championship qualifiers.

== Style of play ==
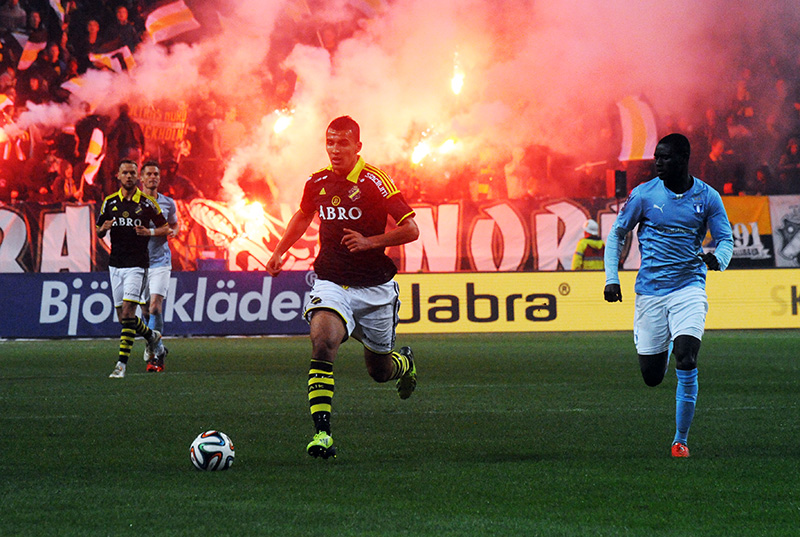
Bahoui playing against Malmö FF at the Friends Arena in 2014

Bahoui usually comes inside the box from the wing and dribbling at opponents. With a high shooting ability he has a "vicious strike from distance".

The main characteristic of his playing style is that he shoots "well" and is dangerous in free kicks. Also, he has high physical strength and considered good at scoring goals.

== Personal life ==
Bahoui's parents were born in Morocco. Bahoui goes by the Swedish-style nickname "Nabbe". In April 2020, he participated in the online FIFA 20 Stay and Play Cup, in which he finished a semifinalist, losing to the eventual winner, Mohamed Daramy. He defeated the representatives for PSV Eindhoven, Manchester City, and Olympique Lyon to reach that point, scoring 12 goals and conceding 5.

== Career statistics ==
As of match played 15 February 2024

Appearances and goals by club, season and competition
Club	Season	League			Cup		Continental		Other		Total	
Club	Season	Division	Apps	Goals	Apps	Goals	Apps	Goals	Apps	Goals	Apps	Goals
Brommapojkarna	2009	Allsvenskan	8	2	1	0	—		—		9	2
Brommapojkarna	2010	Allsvenskan	6	0	1	0	—		—		7	0
Brommapojkarna	2011	Superettan	13	0	2	3	—		—		15	3
Brommapojkarna	2012	Superettan	28	15	0	0	—		—		28	15
Brommapojkarna	Total		55	17	4	3	0	0	—		59	20
Gröndals (loan)	2010	Division 1 Norra	3	1	0	0	—		—		3	1
Väsby United (loan)	2010	Superettan	8	1	0	0	—		—		8	1
Akropolis (loan)	2011	Division 1 Norra	3	0	0	0	—		—		3	0
AIK	2013	Allsvenskan	29	7	4	2	—		—		33	9
AIK	2014	Allsvenskan	26	14	1	0	3 (Note: Appearance(s) in the UEFA Europa League)	1	—		30	15
AIK	2015	Allsvenskan	9	5	2	1	1	2	—		12	8
AIK	Total		64	26	7	3	4	3	—		75	32
Al-Ahli	2015–16	Saudi Professional League	10	0	3	0	—		—		13	0
Hamburger SV	2015–16	Bundesliga	6	0	0	0	—		—		6	0
Hamburger SV	2016–17	Bundesliga	1	0	0	0	—		—		1	0
Hamburger SV	Total		7	0	0	0	0	0	—		7	0
Hamburger SV II	2016–17	Regionalliga Nord	1	0	—		—		—		1	0
Grasshoppers	2017–18	Swiss Super League	12	0	2	0	—		—		14	0
Grasshoppers	2018–19	Swiss Super League	17	3	1	0	—		—		18	3
Grasshoppers	Total		29	3	3	0	0	0	—		32	3
AIK (loan)	2018	Allsvenskan	11	3	4	1	—		—		15	4
De Graafschap	2018–19	Eredivisie	7	0	0	0	—		4 (Note: Appearances in the 2019 Eredivisie relegation play-offs)	1	11	1
AIK	2019	Allsvenskan	8	2	1	0	4	1	—		13	3
AIK	2020	Allsvenskan	17	4	0	0	—		—		17	4
AIK	2021	Allsvenskan	3	2	2	0	—		—		5	2
AIK	Total		28	8	3	0	4	1	—		35	9
Qatar SC	2022–23	QSL	8	0	0	0	—		—		8	0
Qatar SC	Total		8	0	0	0	—		—		8	0
Persepolis	2023–24	Pro League	8	1	0	0	3	0	—		11	1
Persepolis	Total		8	1	0	0	3	0	—		11	1
Career total			242	60	24	7	11	4	4	1	281	72

== Honours ==
AIK

- Allsvenskan: 2018
