= Eero Markkanen =

Finnish footballer (born 1991)

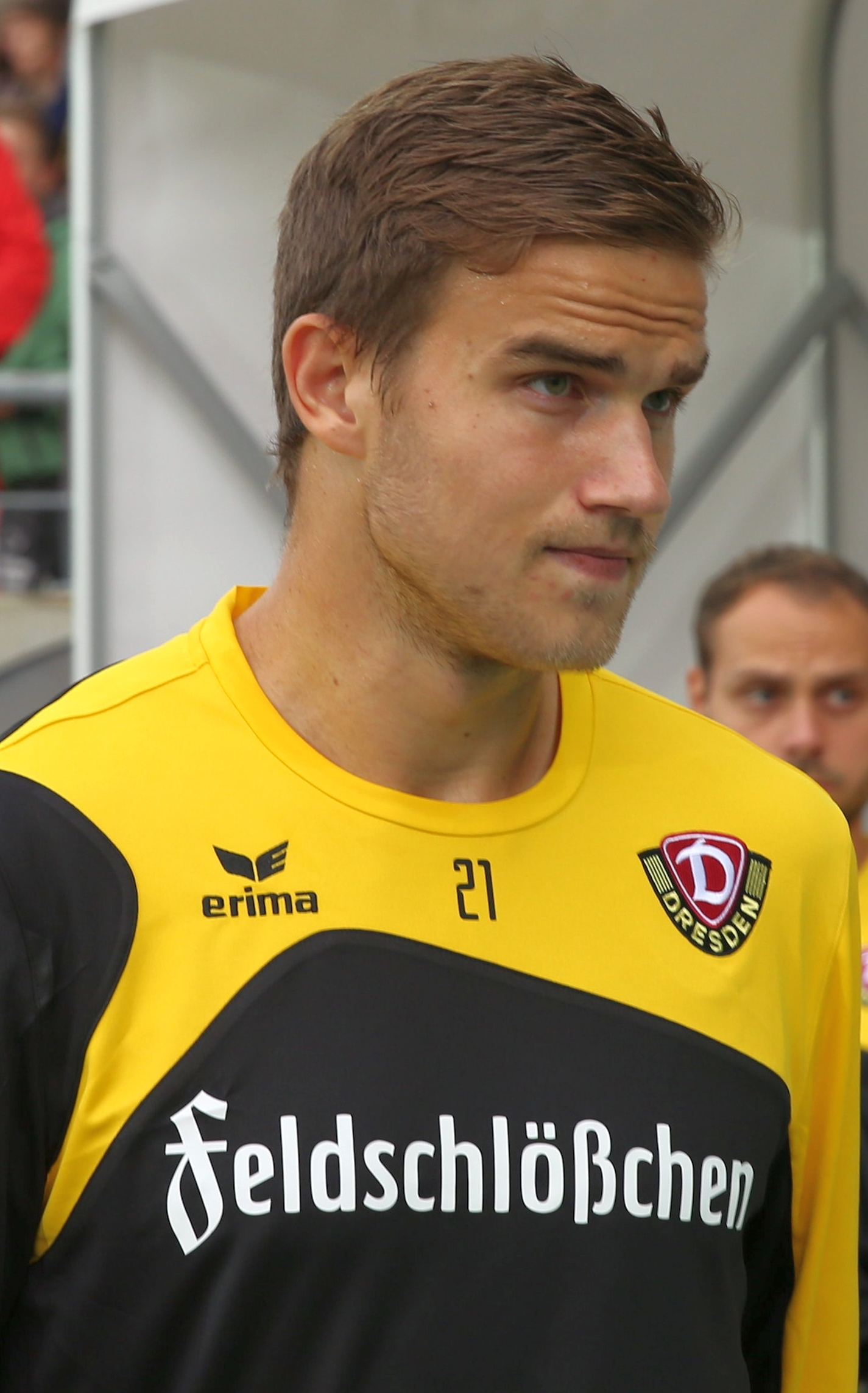
- Markkanen with Dynamo Dresden in 2017

Personal information
- Full name: Eero Pekka Sakari Markkanen
- Date of birth: 3 July 1991 (age 35)
- Place of birth: Jyväskylä, Finland
- Height: 1.97 m (6 ft 5 1/2 in)
- Position: Striker

Team information
- Current team: PK-35
- Number: 9

Youth career
- 2000–2010: JJK

Senior career*
Years	Team	Apps	(Gls)
2010	Blackbird	3	(3)
2011	Vihtavuoren Pamaus	14	(9)
2011	→ JIlves (loan)	2	(1)
2012–2013	JJK	22	(11)
2012	→ Warkaus JK (loan)	12	(9)
2013	→ HJK (loan)	6	(1)
2014	AIK	14	(6)
2014–2015	Real Madrid	0	(0)
2014–2015	Real Madrid Castilla	10	(2)
2015	RoPS	6	(1)
2016–2018	AIK	35	(10)
2017–2018	→ Dynamo Dresden (loan)	9	(0)
2018	→ Randers (loan)	15	(1)
2018	Dalkurd	12	(1)
2019	PSM Makassar	7	(1)
2020	Haka	20	(5)
2021	Orange County	14	(4)
2022	HIFK	23	(3)
2023	Gnistan	28	(11)
2024–2025	PK-35	41	(8)
2026-	Gilla FC	3	(0)

International career^{‡}
2014–2019	Finland	18	(1)
- * Club domestic league appearances and goals as of 24 November 2025 ‡ National team caps and goals as of 11 January 2019

Eero Pekka Sakari Markkanen (born 3 July 1991) is a Finnish professional footballer who plays as a striker for Kolmonen club Gilla FC. He is the son of former basketball player Pekka Markkanen and the older brother of basketball player Lauri Markkanen.

Markkanen made his international debut for Finland in May 2014, at the age of 22 and has since had over 15 caps, including 6 appearances in 2018 FIFA World Cup qualifications.

== Club career ==
=== FC Jyväskylä Blackbird ===
Markkanen made his debut on senior level in Blackbird in season 2010.

=== Vihtavuoren Pamaus ===
For season 2011 he played for Vihtavuoren Pamaus in the Finnish Kakkonen.

=== JJK Jyväskylä ===
In 2012 he returned to JJK and made his Veikkausliiga debut.

=== AIK Fotboll ===
In December 2013 it was announced that AIK had signed Markkanen on a three-year contract.

=== Real Madrid ===
On 23 July 2014, Real Madrid signed Markkanen from AIK on a four-year contract.

In September 2014, he was chosen for Real Madrid's 25-man squad for the UEFA Champions League, but did not make any appearances.

On 21 August 2015, Real Madrid released Markkanen. There were rumours of him reporting back to preseason training overweight, but the club never released an official statement about the issue.

==== Real Madrid Castilla ====
Markkanen made his debut for Real Madrid's reserve team Real Madrid Castilla in Segunda División B on 24 August 2014, playing the full 90 minutes as they lost 2–1 at Atlético Madrid B in Segunda División B Group 2. Six days later he scored his first goal for the club, in a 1–2 home loss to Getafe B. However, he missed most of the 2014–2015 season due to injury.

=== Rovaniemen Palloseura ===
On 3 September 2015, Markkanen was acquired by the Finnish side RoPS for the remainder of the season after failing to sign for AIK who were rejected a request for an exemption to sign him outside of the transfer window by the Swedish Football Association.

=== Return to AIK ===
On 5 November 2015, he signed a three-year contract with AIK. He told the club homepage that he was "Very happy to be back at AIK".

On 4 August 2017, Markkanen joined 2. Bundesliga side Dynamo Dresden on loan for the season, while Dynamo Dresden secured an option to sign him permanently.

On 15 January 2018, Markkanen broke his contract with Dynamo Dresden and went on to join Danish Superliga side Randers on loan from AIK for the rest of the 2017-18 season.

He returned to AIK in late June 2018, but left the club by mutual consent on 10 August 2018.

=== Dalkurd FF ===
On 10 August 2018, Markkanen signed with Dalkurd in Allsvenskan.

=== PSM Makassar ===
On 14 January 2019 it was announced that Markkanen would join PSM Makassar in Liga 1.

=== FC Haka ===
On 7 February 2020 Veikkausliiga side Haka announced that Markkanen would be joining the club on a one-year contract.

=== Orange County SC ===
On 25 December 2020, it was announced that Markkanen would join USL Championship side Orange County ahead of their 2021 season.

=== HIFK Fotboll ===
On 28 February 2022, Markkanen signed with HIFK.

== International career ==
Markkanen made his full international debut on 29 May 2014, replacing Roman Eremenko at half time in a 1–0 defeat to Lithuania in Ventspils in the Baltic Cup. On 7 September 2014, he made his first competitive international appearance, replacing Jere Uronen for the last 15 minutes of a 3–1 win over the Faroe Islands in Tórshavn for UEFA Euro 2016 qualifying. After losing his place in the Finland squad during his spell in Real Madrid Castilla he was once again selected by head coach Hasse Backe in August 2016 for games again Germany and Kosovo. This was after a good summer form with five goals in the last two months for AIK. He made his FIFA World Cup qualification match debut on 6 October 2016 in a match against Iceland when he entered as a 56th-minute substitute for Kasper Hämäläinen.

== Career statistics ==
As of 26 October 2024

Appearances and goals by club, season and competition
Club	Season	League			National Cups		Continental		Other		Total	
Club	Season	Division	Apps	Goals	Apps	Goals	Apps	Goals	Apps	Goals	Apps	Goals
Vihtavuoren Pamaus	2011	Kakkonen	14	9	0	0	—				14	9
Warkaus JK	2012	Kakkonen	12	9	0	0	—				12	9
JJK	2012	Veikkausliiga	14	7	3	0	2 (Note: Appearances in the Europa League)	0	3	0	22	7
JJK	2013	Veikkausliiga	8	4	10	5	—		9	5	18	9
JJK	Total		22	11	13	5	2	0	12	5	37	16
HJK	2013	Veikkausliiga	6	1	0	0	—				6	1
AIK	2014	Allsvenskan	14	6	0	0	—				14	6
Real Madrid B	2014–15	Segunda División B	10	2	0	0	—				10	2
RoPS	2015	Veikkausliiga	6	1	0	0	—				6	1
AIK	2016	Allsvenskan	22	8	5	1	3	1			30	10
AIK	2017	Allsvenskan	13	2	4	1	5	3			22	6
AIK	Total		35	10	9	2	8	4			52	16
Dynamo Dresden (loan)	2017–18	2. Bundesliga	9	0	1	0	—				10	0
Randers (loan)	2017–18	Danish Superliga	15	1	3	1	—				18	2
Dalkurd	2018	Allsvenskan	12	1	0	0	—				12	1
PSM Makassar	2019	Indonesian Liga 1	7	1	7	5	6 (Note: Appearances in the AFC Cup)	5	1	0	21	11
Haka	2020	Veikkausliiga	20	5	5	2	—				25	7
Orange County	2021	USL Championship	14	4	—		—				14	4
HIFK Fotboll	2022	Veikkausliga	20	3	3	3	—		1	0	27	6
Gnistan	2023	Ykkönen	28	11	3	1	—		6	3	37	15
PK-35	2024	Ykkösliiga	20	6	1	0	—		3	0	24	6
Career total			264	81	45	19	16	9	23	8	350	117

=== International ===
As of 11 January 2019

National team	Year	Competitive		Friendly		Total	
National team	Year	Apps	Goals	Apps	Goals	Apps	Goals
Finland	2014	3	0	1	0	4	0
Finland	2015	0	0	1	0	1	0
Finland	2016	2	0	1	0	3	0
Finland	2017	4	0	3	0	7	0
Finland	2018	1	0	0	0	1	0
Finland	2019	0	0	2	1	2	1
Total		10	0	8	1	18	1

International goals

Scores and results list Finland's goal tally first.

No.	Date	Venue	Opponent	Score	Result	Competition
1.	8 January 2019	Jassim bin Hamad Stadium, Doha, Qatar	Sweden	1–0	1–0	Friendly

== Honours ==
HJK Helsinki

- Veikkausliiga: 2013

PSM Makassar

- Piala Indonesia: 2018–19

Orange County SC

- USL Championship: 2021
