= Jan Kristiansen =

Danish footballer (born 1981)

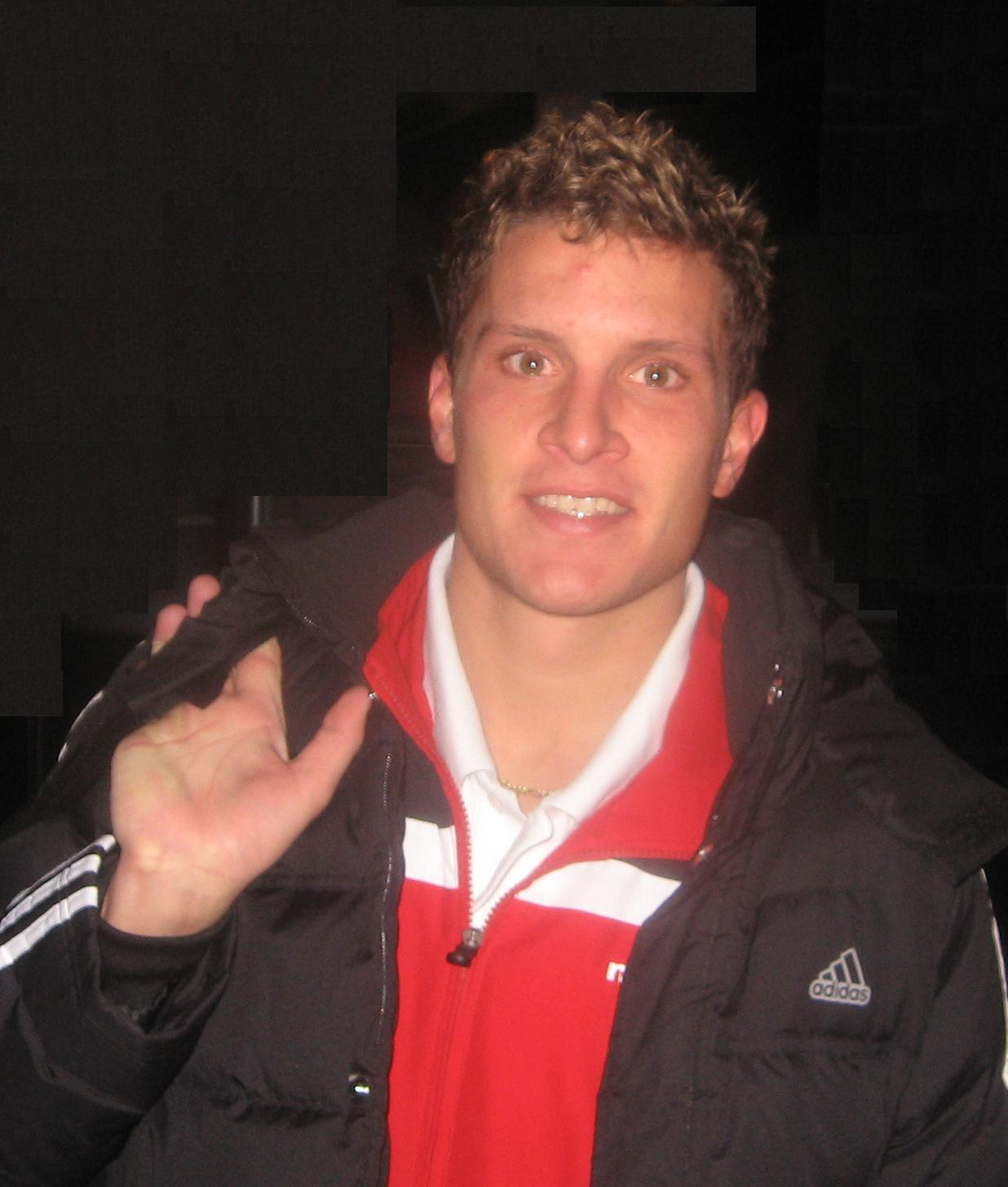
- Kristiansen in 2007

Personal information
- Full name: Jan Kristiansen
- Date of birth: 4 August 1981 (age 45)
- Place of birth: Ølgod, Denmark
- Height: 1.80 m (5 ft 11 in)
- Position: Midfielder

Youth career
- Ølgod IF
- 1994–1999: Esbjerg fB

Senior career*
Years	Team	Apps	(Gls)
1999–2006	Esbjerg fB	178	(48)
2006–2008	1. FC Nürnberg	47	(0)
2008–2013	Brøndby	160	(20)
2013–2015	Vestsjælland	56	(1)
2015–2016	Roskilde	29	(3)
Total		470	(72)

International career
2000–2001	Denmark U19	3	(0)
2002	Denmark U20	4	(0)
2002–2003	Denmark U21	17	(3)
2003–2007	Denmark	11	(0)
- * Club domestic league appearances and goals as of 9 November 2015

Jan Kristiansen (born 4 August 1981) is a Danish former professional footballer who played as a midfielder.

== Biography ==
Kristiansen made his Danish Superliga debut for Esbjerg fB in the 1999–2000 season, which ended in the club being relegated to the Danish 1st Division. After a single season in the 1st Division, Kristiansen returned strongly to the Superliga and he would miss only two of 130 Superliga games over the following four seasons. Since November 2000 he was a member of various Danish national youth teams, and he was selected the 2002 Danish Under-21 Player of the Year. On 12 February 2003, he debuted for the senior Danish national team, coming on as a substitute in a 4–1 win against Egypt, and Kristiansen ended the 2002–03 season as joint Superliga top scorer, he and Søren Frederiksen both scoring 18 goals.

On 12 January 2006, it was announced that Kristiansen would leave Esbjerg fB with immediate effect and move abroad to 1. FC Nürnberg, at that time in the playing Bundesliga. In the 2006–07 seasons, he won the DFB-Pokal with the Franconians, scoring the winning goal in extra time, as Nürnberg beat VfB Stuttgart 3–2.

In July 2008, he returned to his homeland when he signed a five-year contract with Brøndby IF.

On 15 July 2013, he signed a half-year contract with FC Vestsjælland.

On 5 August 2016 Kristiansen announced, that he would retire and continue working as a realtor.

== Honours ==
1. FC Nürnberg

- DFB-Pokal: 2006–07

Individual

- Danish Under-21 Player of the Year: 2002
- Danish Superliga Top Goalscorer: 2002–03
