= Eirik Hestad =

Norwegian footballer (born 1995)

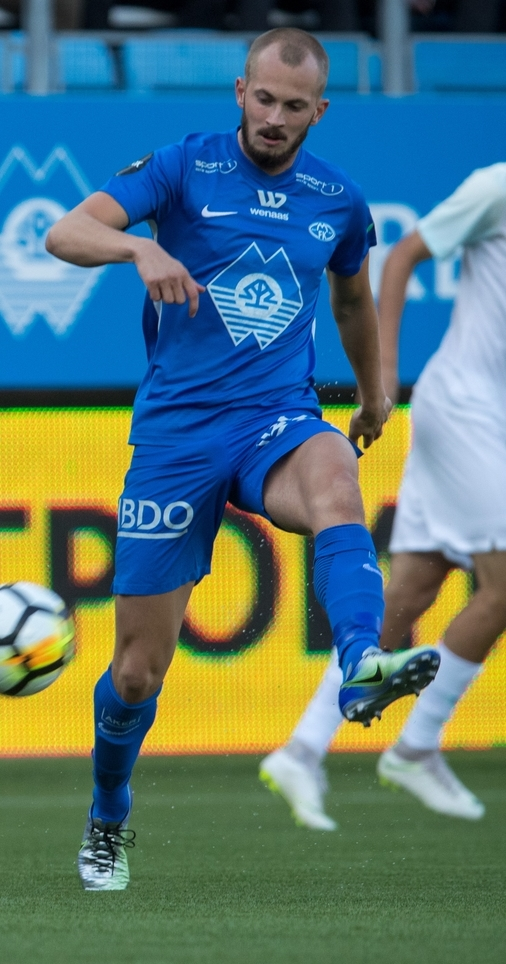
- Hestad with Molde in 2018

Personal information
- Full name: Eirik Hestad
- Date of birth: 26 June 1995 (age 31)
- Place of birth: Aureosen, Norway
- Height: 1.83 m (6 ft 0 in)
- Position: Midfielder

Team information
- Current team: Molde
- Number: 5

Youth career
- Molde

Senior career*
Years	Team	Apps	(Gls)
2012–2016	Molde 2	46	(15)
2012–2021	Molde	161	(23)
2022–2023	Pafos	30	(0)
2023–	Molde	71	(17)

International career^{‡}
2012	Norway U17	8	(3)
2013	Norway U18	12	(3)
2013–2014	Norway U19	5	(0)
2015	Norway U21	3	(0)
- * Club domestic league appearances and goals as of 19 September 2026 ‡ National team caps and goals as of 3 April 2018

Eirik Hestad (born 26 June 1995) is a Norwegian professional footballer who plays as a midfielder who plays for Molde.

== Club career ==
=== Molde ===
In 2012, he dominated for Molde 2 in the 2. divisjon, and made his first-team debut on 25 October 2012 in a Europa League group stage match against Steaua București. He also played internationally for Norway boys-17. He made his Eliteserien debut in September 2013 in a 1–1 draw against Haugesund. On 30 April 2019, Hestad signed a two-year contract extension that ties him to Molde until the end of the 2021 season. On 5 May 2019, Hestad got his 100th appearance in Eliteserien in Molde's 2–1 win away to Haugesund.

=== Pafos ===
On 9 January 2022, Pafos announced the signing of Hestad on a free transfer after his Molde contract had expired. On 13 June 2023, Pafos announced that Hestad had left the club.

=== Return to Molde ===
On 7 July 2023, Hestad returned to Molde, signing a contract until the end of 2027.

== International career ==
Hestad played a total of 28 games and scored 6 goals for Norway at international youth level.

== Career statistics ==
As of 19 September 2026

Appearances and goals by club, season and competition
Club	Season	League			National Cup (Note: Includes Norwegian Cup, Cypriot Cup)		Europe		Total	
Club	Season	Division	Apps	Goals	Apps	Goals	Apps	Goals	Apps	Goals
Molde	2012	Tippeligaen	0	0	0	0	1 (Note: Appearances in UEFA Europa League)	0	1	0
Molde	2013	Tippeligaen	1	0	2	0	0	0	3	0
Molde	2014	Tippeligaen	8	0	1	0	1	0	10	0
Molde	2015	Tippeligaen	13	1	4	0	10 (Note: Three appearances in UEFA Champions League, seven appearances and one goal in UEFA Europa League)	1	27	2
Molde	2016	Tippeligaen	21	3	3	0	2	1	26	4
Molde	2017	Eliteserien	20	0	6	0	—		26	0
Molde	2018	Eliteserien	30	8	1	0	7	7	38	15
Molde	2019	Eliteserien	28	4	2	0	8	1	38	5
Molde	2020	Eliteserien	23	4	—		10 (Note: Five appearances and one goal in UEFA Champions League, five appearances in UEFA Europa League)	1	33	5
Molde	2021	Eliteserien	17	3	2	0	7	1	26	4
Molde	Total		161	23	21	0	46	12	228	35
Pafos	2021–22	Cypriot First Division	8	0	2	0	—		10	0
Pafos	2022–23	Cypriot First Division	22	0	2	1	—		24	1
Pafos	Total		30	0	4	1	—		34	1
Molde	2023	Eliteserien	11	3	1	0	5 (Note: One appearance and one goal in UEFA Champions League, four appearances in UEFA Europa League)	1	17	4
Molde	2024	Eliteserien	20	3	3	1	9 (Note: Appearances in UEFA Europa Conference League)	1	32	5
Molde	2025	Eliteserien	24	3	4	2	6 (Note: Six appearance and one goal in Europa Conference League)	1	34	6
Molde	2026	Eliteserien	16	8	2	2	—		18	10
Molde	Total		71	17	10	5	20	3	101	25
Career total			262	40	35	6	66	15	363	61

== Honours ==
=== Club ===
Molde

- Tippeligaen/Eliteserien: 2014, 2019
- Norwegian Cup: 2013, 2014, 2023

=== Individual ===
- Eliteserien Top assist provider: 2019
