= Daniel Chima Chukwu =

Nigerian footballer

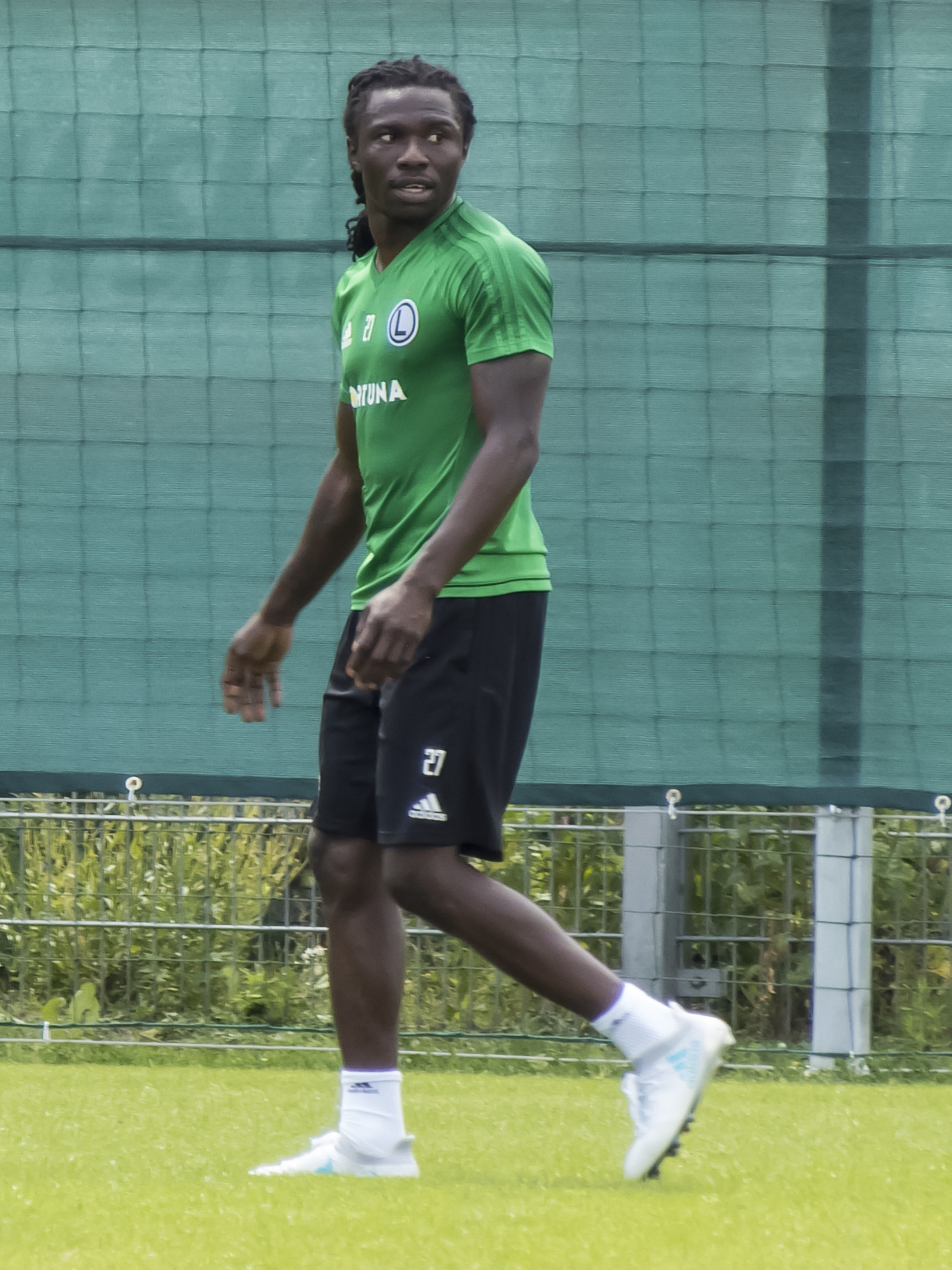
- Chukwu in training with Legia Warsaw in 2017

Personal information
- Full name: Daniel Chima Chuwku
- Date of birth: 4 April 1991 (age 35)
- Place of birth: Kano, Nigeria
- Height: 1.80 m (5 ft 11 in)
- Position: Striker

Youth career
- Festac Sport
- Bussdor United

Senior career*
Years	Team	Apps	(Gls)
2010	Lyn	11	(4)
2010–2015	Molde	107	(31)
2015–2017	Shanghai Shenxin	49	(21)
2017–2018	Legia Warsaw	4	(1)
2017	Legia Warsaw II	3	(3)
2018–2020	Molde	11	(3)
2019	→ Heilongjiang Lava Spring (loan)	23	(15)
2020–2021	Taizhou Yuanda	13	(3)
2021–2022	East Bengal	10	(2)
2022–2024	Jamshedpur	50	(18)
2024–2026	Chennaiyin	33	(8)
- * Club domestic league appearances and goals as of 16:47, 16 May 2026 (UTC)

Daniel Chima Chukwu (born 4 April 1991) is a Nigerian professional footballer who plays as a forward.

== Career ==
=== Early career ===
Chima started playing football for Festac Sport, before going on loan to Bussdor United.

He joined the Norwegian First Division side Lyn at the beginning of the 2010-season, and scored his first goal in his debut against Bodø/Glimt on 5 April 2010.

=== Molde ===
Following the bankruptcy of Lyn, Chima joined Tippeligaen side Molde on 28 July 2010.

==== 2011 season ====
On 25 April 2011, he secured a 3–1 win against Brann with a stoppage-time goal, which was also his first goal for Molde. He played 24 games and scored five goals in the 2011 Tippeligaen and contributed to Molde's first ever league championship.

==== 2012 season ====
On 4 August 2012, Chukwu scored the winning goal which gave champions Molde FK victory over Sogndal in the Tippeligaen. On 30 September 2012, he fired a treble against Stabaek in a 4–3 victory to shoot Norwegian champions Molde back to the top of the table. Chima was the hero of his club as he sealed victory in a 2–0 win over Stuttgart in the Europa League on 4 October 2012. On 8 November 2012, he got on the score sheet, but ended up on the losing side as Steaua București completed a two way win in a Europa League group clash. Chima scored the only goal in Molde's 1–0 home victory against Hønefoss on 11 November 2012, which, coupled with their title challengers Strømsgodset's 2–1 defeat away to Sandnes Ulf, secured Molde's second Tippeligaen title. In December 2012, reports surfaced that Chima was wanted by Romanian club Steaua București, who were weighing a bid. His agent Atta Aneke confirmed to Aftenposten that Steaua had shown interest in signing him in the winter of 2012.

=== Shanghai Shenxin ===
On 29 January 2015, Molde agreed to sell Chima to Shanghai Shenxin.

=== Legia Warsaw ===
On 5 January 2017, he signed a contract with Polish side Legia Warsaw. He played a total of nine games for the club before returning to Molde.

=== Return to Molde ===
On 14 February 2018, he once again signed a contract with Molde FK for an undisclosed fee. He scored six goals in 17 games in the 2018 season. On 18 February 2019, Chima Chukwu joined Chinese club Heilongjiang Lava Spring on loan until the end of the 2019 season.

=== Taizhou Yuanda ===
In February 2020, Chima Chukwu moved to Chinese club Taizhou Yuanda where he signed a two-year contract.

=== East Bengal ===
On 16 September 2021, Chukwu signed with Indian Super League side SC East Bengal on a one-year deal. He scored a brace on 30 November against Odisha FC, but lost the match by 6–4.

== Career statistics ==
=== Club ===
As of match played 14 September 2024

Appearances and goals by club, season and competition
Club	Season	League			National cup (Note: Includes Norwegian Football Cup, Chinese FA Cup, Polish Cup, AIFF Super Cup)		Continental		Other		Total	
Club	Season	Division	Apps	Goals	Apps	Goals	Apps	Goals	Apps	Goals	Apps	Goals
Lyn	2010	1. divisjon	11	4	3	2	—		—		14	6
Molde	2010	Tippeligaen	4	0	0	0	—		—		4	0
Molde	2011	Tippeligaen	24	5	5	7	—		—		29	12
Molde	2012	Tippeligaen	24	7	4	1	11 (Note: Four appearances in UEFA Champions League, seven appearances and three goals in UEFA Europa League)	3	—		39	11
Molde	2013	Tippeligaen	28	9	5	2	6 (Note: Four appearances and two goals in UEFA Champions League, two appearances UEFA Europa League)	2	—		39	13
Molde	2014	Tippeligaen	27	10	6	4	3 (Note: Appearances UEFA Europa League)	0	—		36	14
Molde	Total		107	31	20	14	20	5	—		147	50
Shanghai Shenxin	2015	Chinese Super League	27	10	0	0	—		—		27	10
Shanghai Shenxin	2016	China League One	22	11	1	0	—		—		23	11
Shanghai Shenxin	Total		49	21	1	0	0	0	—		50	21
Legia Warsaw	2016–17	Ekstraklasa	2	0	0	0	1	0	—		3	0
Legia Warsaw	2017–18	Ekstraklasa	2	0	4	0	—		—		6	0
Legia Warsaw	Total		4	0	4	0	1	0	—		9	0
Legia Warsaw II	2016–17	III liga, group I	3	3	—		—		—		3	3
Molde	2018	Eliteserien	11	3	2	3	4	0	—		17	6
Heilongjiang Lava Spring (loan)	2019	China League One	23	15	0	0	—		—		23	15
Taizhou Yuanda	2020	China League One	13	3	1	0	—		—		14	3
East Bengal	2021–22	Indian Super League	10	2	0	0	—		—		10	2
Jamshedpur	2021–22	Indian Super League	11	7	0	0	—		—		11	7
Jamshedpur	2022–23	Indian Super League	19	5	3	0	—		1 (Note: Appearance in play-offs for AFC Champions League)	0	23	5
Jamshedpur	2023–24	Indian Super League	20	6	2	3	—		—		22	9
Jamshedpur	Total		50	18	5	3	0	0	1	0	56	21
Chennaiyin	2024–25	Indian Super League	1	1	0	0	—		—		1	1
Career total			282	101	36	22	25	5	1	0	344	128

== Honours ==
Molde

- Tippeligaen: 2011, 2012, 2014
- Norwegian Cup: 2013, 2014

Legia Warsaw

- Ekstraklasa: 2016–17

Jamshedpur

- Indian Super League League Winners' Shield: 2021–22

Individual

- Molde top scorer: 2013
