= Niklas Backman =

Swedish footballer (born 1988)

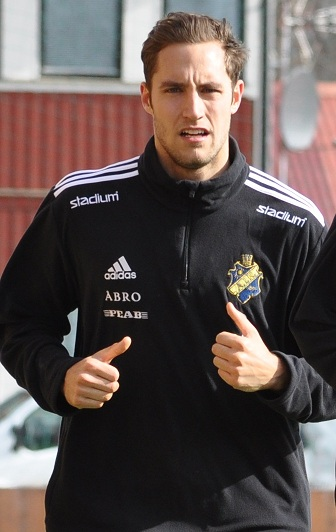

Personal information
- Full name: Niklas Alexander Backman
- Date of birth: 13 November 1988 (age 37)
- Place of birth: Västerås, Sweden
- Height: 1.86 m (6 ft 1 in)
- Position: Centre back

Youth career
- 1993–2004: Skiljebo SK

Senior career*
Years	Team	Apps	(Gls)
2005–2007	Skiljebo SK		
2008–2009	Väsby United	56	(0)
2010–2013	AIK	92	(2)
2014–2015	Dalian Aerbin	59	(5)
2016–2021	AGF	98	(3)
Total		305	(10)

International career
2009–2010	Sweden U21	5	(0)
2011–2014	Sweden	6	(0)
- * Club domestic league appearances and goals

Niklas Alexander Backman (born 13 November 1988) is a Swedish former professional footballer who played as a centre back.

He played for Skiljebo SK, AIK, Dalian Aerbin, and AGF during a career that spanned between 2005 and 2021. A full international between 2011 and 2014, he won six caps for the Sweden national team.

== Club career ==
Backman started playing football for local Västerås team Skiljebo SK as a youth. He played with Skiljebo SK until 2008 when he was transferred to Väsby United in the Swedish second division Superettan. He played 56 games for the club and completed the 2009 season in style at Väsby keeping them in the Superettan. During the summer of 2009, his playing rights were transferred to AIK, but he continued playing matches for Väsby. He made no appearances for AIK during their championship-winning campaign. In 2010, he played his first match for AIK.

On 14 October 2021, 32-year old Backman announced his retirement from football, after he experienced symptoms stemming from his previous head injuries.

== International career ==
On 19 January 2011, he made his debut for Sweden in a friendly 2–1 away win over Botswana. He won his sixth and final cap on 21 January 2014 in a friendly 2–0 win against Iceland, coming on a substitute for Pontus Jansson in the 83rd minute.

== Career statistics ==
=== Club ===
Appearances and goals by club, season and competition
Club	Season	Division	League		Cup		Europe		Total	
Club	Season	Division	Apps	Goals	Apps	Goals	Apps	Goals	Apps	Goals
Väsby United	2008	Superettan	30	0	—		—		30	0
Väsby United	2009	Superettan	26	0	—		—		26	0
Väsby United	Total		56	0	—		—		56	0
AIK	2010	Allsvenskan	24	0	3	0	4	0	31	0
AIK	2011	Allsvenskan	30	1	1	0	—		31	1
AIK	2012	Allsvenskan	28	1	2	0	8	0	38	1
AIK	2013	Allsvenskan	10	0	1	0	—		11	0
AIK	Total		92	2	7	0	12	0	111	2
Dalian Aerbin	2014	Chinese Super League	29	2	0	0	—		29	2
Dalian Aerbin	2015	China League One	30	3	1	0	—		31	3
Dalian Aerbin	Total		59	5	1	0	—		60	5
AGF	2015–16	Danish Superliga	14	1	4	0	—		18	1
AGF	2016–17	Danish Superliga	25	1	2	1	—		27	1
AGF	2017–18	Danish Superliga	21	1	1	0	—		22	1
AGF	2018–19	Danish Superliga	12	0	0	0	—		12	0
AGF	2019–20	Danish Superliga	22	0	3	0	—		25	0
AGF	2020–21	Danish Superliga	4	0	0	0	1	0	5	0
AGF	Total		98	3	10	1	1	0	109	4
Career Total			305	10	18	1	13	0	336	11

=== International ===
Appearances and goals by national team and year
National team	Year	Apps	Goals
Sweden	2011	2	0
Sweden	2012	1	0
Sweden	2013	1	0
Sweden	2014	2	0
Total		6	0

== Honours ==
AIK

- Supercupen: 2010
