= 2015 AIK Fotboll season =

AIK
2015 season
- Chairman: Johan Segui
- Manager: Andreas Alm
- Stadium: Skytteholms IP; Friends Arena
- Allsvenskan: 3rd
- 2014–15 Svenska Cupen: Group stage
- 2015–16 Svenska Cupen: Progress to 2016 season
- UEFA Europa League: Third Qualifying Round vs Atromitos
- Top goalscorer: League: Henok Goitom (18); All: Henok Goitom (27)
- Highest home attendance: 43,713 vs IFK Göteborg (26 October 2015)
- Lowest home attendance: 3,015 vs Landskrona BoIS (21 February 2015)
- Average home league attendance: 20,983 (Allsvenskan - 26 October 2015); 19,217 (All competitions - 26 October 2015)
Home colours	Away colours	Third colours

The 2015 season was AIK's 124th in existence, their 87th season in Allsvenskan, and their 10th consecutive season in the league. The team competed in Allsvenskan, UEFA Europa League, and Svenska Cupen.

== Season events ==
Prior to the start of the season, AIK announced the signings Haukur Hauksson to a five-year contract, Fredrik Brustad and Johan Blomberg to a three-year contracts and that Mohamed Bangura would return on a two-year contract from İstanbul Başakşehir.

On 23 December 2014, AIK announced the signing of free-agent Dickson Etuhu to a two-year contract after he had left Blackburn Rovers during the summer of 2014, and that Ibrahim Moro had been sold to Kairat effective 1 January.

On 14 January, Celso Borges left AIK to join Deportivo La Coruña on loan until the summer of 2015, with an option to make the move permanent.

On 3 February, AIK announced the signing of Patrick Kpozo from International Allies from 15 July, when he turned 18-years old.

On 6 February, Ebenezer Ofori signed a 12-month extension to his contract, keeping him at AIK until the end of the 2017 season.

On 24 February, AIK announced the loan signing of Alex Pereira from AFC United until the summer transfer window.

On 10 July, AIK announced the signing of Jos Hooiveld and Stefan Ishizaki on contracts until the end of 2017.

On 30 July, AIK extended their loan agreement for Alex Pereira until the end of the season.

On 2 September, Sauli Väisänen joined HIFK on loan for the remainder of the season.

== Squad ==
As of match played 31 October 2015

No.	Name	Nationality	Position	Date of birth (age)	Signed from	Signed in	Contract ends	Apps.	Goals
Goalkeepers
13	Kyriakos Stamatopoulos	(Canada)	GK	28 August 1979 (aged 36)	Tromsø	2011		61	0
34	Oscar Linnér	(Sweden)	GK	23 February 1997 (aged 18)	Academy	2015		4	0
35	Patrik Carlgren	(Sweden)	GK	8 January 1992 (aged 23)	IK Brage	2013	2016	56	0
Defenders
3	Per Karlsson	(Sweden)	DF	2 January 1986 (aged 29)	Academy	2003			
4	Nils-Eric Johansson	(Sweden)	DF	13 January 1980 (aged 35)	Leicester City	2007		295	17
12	Haukur Hauksson	(Iceland)	DF	1 September 1991 (aged 24)	KR	2015	2019	30	0
16	Alex Pereira	(Brazil)	DF	15 May 1982 (aged 33)	on loan from AFC United	2015	2015	18	2
18	Noah Sundberg	(Sweden)	DF	6 June 1996 (aged 19)	Academy	2013		38	3
26	Jos Hooiveld	(Netherlands)	DF	22 April 1983 (aged 32)	Unattached	2015	2017	42	1
32	Patrick Kpozo	(Ghana)	DF	15 July 1997 (aged 18)	International Allies	2015		1	0
Midfielders
8	Johan Blomberg	(Sweden)	MF	14 June 1987 (aged 28)	Halmstad	2015	2017	39	6
14	Kenny Pavey	(England)	MF	23 August 1979 (aged 36)	Öster	2014	2015	191	16
15	Gabriel Ferreyra	(Argentina)	MF	3 February 1994 (aged 21)	on loan from Boca Juniors	2014	2015	2	0
17	Ebenezer Ofori	(Ghana)	MF	1 July 1995 (aged 20)	New Edubiase United	2013	2017	67	2
20	Dickson Etuhu	(Nigeria)	MF	8 June 1982 (aged 33)	Unattached	2015	2016	30	2
21	William Sheriff	(Sweden)	MF	30 October 1996 (aged 19)	Academy	2015		0	0
24	Stefan Ishizaki	(Sweden)	MF	15 May 1982 (aged 33)	Unattached	2015	2017		
28	Niclas Eliasson	(Sweden)	MF	7 December 1995 (aged 19)	Falkenberg	2014	2017	34	2
29	Anton Salétros	(Sweden)	MF	12 April 1996 (aged 19)	Academy	2013		47	1
31	Christos Gravius	(Sweden)	MF	14 October 1997 (aged 18)	Academy	2015		2	0
Forwards
7	Fredrik Brustad	(Norway)	FW	22 June 1989 (aged 26)	Stabæk	2015	2017	35	7
9	Marko Nikolić	(Sweden)	FW	17 September 1997 (aged 18)	Academy	2014		17	1
10	Henok Goitom	(Eritrea)	FW	22 September 1984 (aged 31)	Almería	2012		114	52
23	Mohamed Bangura	(Sierra Leone)	FW	27 July 1989 (aged 26)	İstanbul Başakşehir	2015	2016	93	30
Out on loan
2	Sauli Väisänen	(Finland)	DF	5 June 1994 (aged 21)	Honka	2014		15	2
	Edward Owusu	(Sweden)	DF	13 January 1994 (aged 21)	Brommapojkarna	2011		0	0
Left during the season
5	Panajotis Dimitriadis	(Sweden)	MF	12 August 1986 (aged 29)	Brommapojkarna	2014	2017	17	0
6	Alexander Milošević	(Sweden)	DF	30 January 1992 (aged 23)	Vasalund	2011	2014	87	4
11	Nabil Bahoui	(Sweden)	MF	5 February 1991 (aged 24)	Brommapojkarna	2013	2016	75	32
22	Kwame Karikari	(Ghana)	FW	20 January 1992 (aged 23)	International Allies	2011	2015	58	9
25	Sam Lundholm	(Sweden)	MF	1 July 1994 (aged 21)	Academy	2012		41	2
26	Nicklas Maripuu	(Sweden)	MF	2 March 1992 (aged 23)	Väsby United	2010		14	0
30	Lalawélé Atakora	(Togo)	MF	9 November 1990 (aged 24)	Fredrikstad	2011	2015	52	3
	Celso Borges	(Costa Rica)	MF	27 May 1988 (aged 27)	Fredrikstad	2012		97	23

== Transfers ==
=== In ===
Date	Position	Nationality	Name	From	Fee	Ref.
1 January 2015	DF	(Iceland)	Haukur Hauksson	KR	Undisclosed	
1 January 2015	MF	(Nigeria)	Dickson Etuhu	Unattached	Free	
1 January 2015	MF	(Sweden)	Johan Blomberg	Halmstad	Undisclosed	
1 January 2015	FW	(Norway)	Fredrik Brustad	Stabæk	Free	
1 January 2015	FW	(Sierra Leone)	Mohamed Bangura	İstanbul Başakşehir	Undisclosed	
10 July 2015	DF	(Netherlands)	Jos Hooiveld	Unattached	Free	
10 July 2015	MF	(Sweden)	Stefan Ishizaki	Unattached	Free	
15 July 2015	DF	(Ghana)	Patrick Kpozo	International Allies	Undisclosed	

=== Loans in ===
Start date	Position	Nationality	Name	From	End date	Ref.
11 August 2014	MF	(Argentina)	Gabriel Ferreyra	Boca Juniors	31 December 2015	
24 February 2015	DF	(Brazil)	Alex Pereira	AFC United	31 December 2015	

=== Out ===
Date	Position	Nationality	Name	To	Fee	Ref.
1 January 2015	MF	(Ghana)	Ibrahim Moro	Kairat	Undisclosed	
1 January 2015	FW	(Nigeria)	Kennedy Igboananike	Chicago Fire	Undisclosed	
7 January 2015	DF	(Sweden)	Alexander Milošević	Beşiktaş	Undisclosed	
14 January 2015	MF	(Togo)	Lalawélé Atakora	Helsingborg	Undisclosed	
22 January 2015	FW	(Ghana)	Kwame Karikari	Halmstad	Undisclosed	
13 February 2015	MF	(Sweden)	Nicklas Maripuu	IK Sirius	Undisclosed	
9 June 2015	MF	(Sweden)	Panajotis Dimitriadis	Gençlerbirliği	Undisclosed	
8 July 2015	MF	(Sweden)	Nabil Bahoui	Al Ahli	Undisclosed	
11 August 2015	MF	(Sweden)	Sam Lundholm	NEC Nijmegen	Undisclosed	

=== Loans out ===
Start date	Position	Nationality	Name	To	End date	Ref.
14 January 2015	MF	(Costa Rica)	Celso Borges	Deportivo La Coruña	30 June 2015	
1 July 2015	DF	(Finland)	Sauli Väisänen	HIFK	31 December 2015	

=== Released ===
Date	Position	Nationality	Name	Joined	Date	Ref
31 December 2015	DF	(Sweden)	Edward Owusu	Piteå	1 January 2016	
31 December 2015	MF	(England)	Kenny Pavey	Assyriska	1 January 2016	
31 December 2015	MF	(Sweden)	Alexander Hedman	IK Sirius	1 January 2016	
31 December 2015	FW	(Eritrea)	Henok Goitom	Getafe	22 March 2016	

== Friendlies ==
17 January 2015	Vasalunds IF	1–4	AIK	Stockholm
14:00 CET (UTC+1)	Bazoukou 83'	Report	Salétros 5'; Lundholm 39'; Goitom 42'; Eliasson 56'	Stadium: Skytteholms IP; Attendance: 1,000; Referee: Dragan Banjac

24 January 2015	AIK	4–3	Lahti	Stockholm
13:00 CET (UTC+1)	Bahoui 79'; Eliasson 82', 90'; Pavey 88'	Report	Hauhia 53'; Ääritalo 70'; Ristola 76'	Stadium: Skytteholms IP; Attendance: 1,452

4 February 2015	Krylia Sovetov	2–1	AIK	Dubai, United Arab Emirates
16:00 CET (UTC+1)	37'; 51'	Report	Lundholm 33'	Stadium: Jebel Ali Centre of Excellence; Attendance: 70

8 February 2015	Olimpik Donetsk	0–0	AIK	Dubai, United Arab Emirates
17:00 CET (UTC+1)		Report		Stadium: Nad al Sheba Sports Complex

14 February 2015	AIK	0–0	Gefle IF	Stockholm
13:00 CET (UTC+1)		Report		Stadium: Skytteholms IP; Attendance: 2,015; Referee: Mohammed Al-Hakim

14 March 2015	AIK	3–1	AFC United	Stockholm
13:00 CET (UTC+1)	Blomberg 10'; Lundholm 12', 63'	Report	Omeje	Stadium: Skytteholms IP; Attendance: 708

21 March 2015	Åtvidaberg	1–2	AIK	Åtvidaberg
13:00 CET (UTC+1)	Owoeri 4'	Report	Goitom 21'; Johansson 61'	Stadium: Kopparvallen; Attendance: 593; Referee: Martin Strömbergsson

28 March 2015	AIK	0–0	IFK Norrköping	Solna
15:00 CET (UTC+1)		Report		Stadium: Friends Arena; Attendance: 2,120; Referee: Johan Hamlin

25 June 2015	Nordsjælland	1–1	AIK	Helsingør, Denmark
14:00 CEST (UTC+2)	Thychosen 7'	Report	Bahoui 70'	Stadium: Helsingør Stadium; Attendance: 100; Referee: Michael Johansen

5 November 2015	AIK	2–3	Dalkurd FF	Stockholm
18:00 CET (UTC+1)	Johansson (yellow card) 20' (goal) 85' (pen.); Salétros (yellow card) 61'; Nikolić 70'	Report	Mete 15', 54'; Vigariu (yellow card) 85'; Frimpong 90' (pen.)	Stadium: Skytteholms IP; Attendance: 1,057; Referee: Björn Särnbrink

12 November 2015	AIK	3–2	Assyriska FF	Stockholm
18:00 CET (UTC+1)	Mansiamina 6', 59'; Hooiveld (yellow card) 15'; Ramirez (yellow card) 35'; Kayembe 46'; Gravius (yellow card) 65'	Report	Vukojević 13'; Leschuk 38' (pen.); Malmborg (yellow card) 44'	Stadium: Skytteholms IP; Attendance: 366; Referee: Farouk Ben Ahmed Nehdi

19 November 2015	AIK	3–2	Syrianska	Stockholm
16:00 CET (UTC+1)	Mansiamina 25'; Anabila (yellow card) 44'; Eliasson 62'; Gravius 90+2'	Report	Oyal 3'; Nilsson (yellow card) 21'; Katourgi 84'	Stadium: Skytteholms IP; Attendance: 162; Referee: Ozan Camlibel

== Competitions ==
=== Overview ===
Competition	First match	Last match	Starting round	Final position	Record							
Competition	First match	Last match	Starting round	Final position	Pld	W	D	L	GF	GA	GD	Win %
Allsvenskan	6 April 2015	31 October 2015	Matchday 1	3rd	30	18	7	5	54	34	+20	60.00
2014–15 Svenska Cupen	21 February 2015	7 March 2015	From to 2014 season	Group stage	3	2	0	1	8	2	+6	66.67
2015–16 Svenska Cupen	19 August 2015	Progress to 2016 season	Second round	Progress to 2016 season	1	1	0	0	6	0	+6	100.00
UEFA Europa League	2 July 2015	6 August 2015	First qualifying round	Third qualifying round	6	3	1	2	11	6	+5	50.00
Total					40	24	8	8	79	42	+37	60.00

Last updated: 31 October 2015
Source: Competitions

=== Allsvenskan ===
==== League table ====
Pos	Team	Pld	W	D	L	GF	GA	GD	Pts	Qualification or relegation
1	IFK Norrköping (C)	30	20	6	4	60	33	+27	66	Qualification for the Champions League second qualifying round
2	IFK Göteborg	30	18	9	3	52	22	+30	63	Qualification for the Europa League first qualifying round
3	AIK	30	18	7	5	54	34	+20	61	Qualification for the Europa League first qualifying round
4	IF Elfsborg	30	16	7	7	59	42	+17	55	
5	Malmö FF	30	15	9	6	54	34	+20	54	

Source: svenskfotboll.se (in Swedish)
Rules for classification: 1) Points; 2) Goal difference; 3) Goals scored; 4) Head-to-head points; 5) Head-to-head goal difference; 6) Head-to-head away goals scored; 7) Play-off
(Note: Play-off is only played if need to decide champion, teams for relegation or UEFA competition and will be played on a neutral ground).
(C) Champions

==== Results summary ====
Overall								Home						Away					
Pld	W	D	L	GF	GA	GD	Pts	W	D	L	GF	GA	GD	W	D	L	GF	GA	GD
30	18	7	5	54	34	+20	61	13	1	1	36	16	+20	5	6	4	18	18	0

Last updated: 31 October 2015.
Source: (in Swedish)

==== Results by round ====
Round	1	2	3	4	5	6	7	8	9	10	11	12	13	14	15	16	17	18	19	20	21	22	23	24	25	26	27	28	29	30
Ground	H	A	H	A	H	A	H	H	A	A	H	H	A	A	H	A	H	A	H	H	A	H	A	H	A	A	H	A	H	A
Result	W	D	W	L	W	D	W	D	L	D	W	W	D	D	W	L	W	W	W	W	W	W	W	W	W	L	W	W	L	D
Position	4	7	3	5	4	4	4	5	6	6	6	6	6	6	5	6	6	5	5	3	3	2	2	3	3	3	3	2	3	3

Updated to match(es) played on 31 October 2015. Source: see Results
A = Away; H = Home; W = Win; D = Draw; L = Loss

==== Results ====
6 April 2015 1	AIK	2–1	Halmstad	Stockholm
15:00 CEST (UTC+2)	Goitom 59'; Blomberg 71' (yellow card) 78'	Report	Gyan (yellow card) 58'; Fagercrantz 83'	Stadium: Friends Arena; Attendance: 23,840; Referee: Andreas Ekberg

9 April 2015 2	Malmö	0–0	AIK	Malmö
19:05 CEST (UTC+2)	Yotún (yellow card) 29'; Lewicki (yellow card) 72'; Johansson (yellow card) 90+6'	Report	Ofori (yellow card) 68'; Sundberg (yellow card) 69'	Stadium: Swedbank Stadion; Attendance: 22,337; Referee: Stefan Johannesson

12 April 2015 3	AIK	3–1	Gefle	Stockholm
17:30 CEST (UTC+2)	Blomberg 1' (yellow card) 60'; Hauksson (yellow card) 63'; Goitom 79'; Bangura 84'	Report	Johansson 55' (o.g.); Nilsson (yellow card) 89'	Stadium: Friends Arena; Attendance: 13,722; Referee: Bojan Pandžić

21 April 2015 4	Elfsborg	3–2	AIK	Borås
18:30 CEST (UTC+2)	Claesson 8' (yellow card) 87'; Frick 15'; Zeneli 21'; Rohdén (yellow card) 33'	Report	Bahoui 2', 18'; Carlgren (yellow card) 34'; Blomberg (yellow card) 46'	Stadium: Borås Arena; Attendance: 8,444; Referee: Michael Lerjéus

26 April 2015 5	AIK	3–0	Örebro	Stockholm
17:30 CEST (UTC+2)	Bahoui 30'; Goitom 35'; Brustad 71'	Report	Björnquist (yellow card) 4' (yellow-red card) 49'	Stadium: Friends Arena; Attendance: 14,331; Referee: Andreas Ekberg

29 April 2015 6	Åtvidaberg	1–1	AIK	Åtvidaberg
19:05 CEST (UTC+2)	Owoeri 83' (pen.)	Report	Brustad 69'; Väisänen (yellow card) 84'; Ofori (yellow card) 85'	Stadium: Kopparvallen; Attendance: 5,215; Referee: Kristoffer Karlsson

4 May 2015 7	AIK	2–0	Hammarby	Stockholm
19:05 CEST (UTC+2)	Goitom 56'; Sundberg 75' (yellow card) 76'; Väisänen (yellow card) 83'; Ofori (yellow card) 90+1'	Report	Persson (yellow card) 11'; Solheim (yellow card) 89'; Arce (yellow card) 90+5'	Stadium: Friends Arena; Attendance: 41,630; Referee: Mohammed Al-Hakim

10 May 2015 8	AIK	2–2	IFK Norrköping	Stockholm
17:30 CEST (UTC+2)	Goitom 34'; Väisänen 37' (yellow card) 34'; Hauksson (yellow card) 82'	Report	Fransson 33' (yellow card) 88'; Kujović 49'	Stadium: Friends Arena; Attendance: 13,123; Referee: Stefan Johannesson

21 May 2015 9	IFK Göteborg	3–0	AIK	Gothenburg
19:05 CEST (UTC+2)	Rieks (yellow card) 12'; Rogne (yellow card) 35'; Vibe 38'; Karlsson 55' (o.g.); Boman 70'	Report	Etuhu (yellow card) 35'	Stadium: Gamla Ullevi; Attendance: 14,682; Referee: Jonas Eriksson

25 May 2015 10	Djurgården	2–2	AIK	Stockholm
19:05 CEST (UTC+2)	Mrabti 54', 83'	Report	Johansson 3'; Bangura 45+1'; Lundholm (yellow card) 65'	Stadium: Tele2 Arena; Attendance: 27,137; Referee: Stefan Johannesson

31 May 2015 11	AIK	3–1	Helsingborg	Stockholm
15:00 CEST (UTC+2)	Bahoui 37' (pen.), 67' (yellow card) 69'; Salétros (yellow card) 50'; Bangura 77'	Report	Simović 42' (yellow card) 37'; P. Larsson (red card) 90'	Stadium: Friends Arena; Attendance: 12,512; Referee: Markus Strömbergsson

3 June 2015 12	AIK	4–3	Falkenberg	Stockholm
19:00 CEST (UTC+2)	Etuhu 26'; Blomberg 50'; Goitom 71', 75'	Report	Rodevåg 32'; Vall 46'; Keat (yellow card) 67' (goal) 73'; Eriksson (yellow card) 75'	Stadium: Friends Arena; Attendance: 10,701; Referee: Martin Hansson

6 June 2015 13	BK Häcken	0–0	AIK	Gothenburg
16:00 CEST (UTC+2)	Zuta (yellow card) 30'	Report	Bahoui (yellow card) 26'; Pereira (yellow card) 47'; Pavey (yellow card) 84'; Ofori (yellow card) 85'	Stadium: Gamla Ullevi; Attendance: 3,460; Referee: Mohammed Al-Hakim

5 July 2015 14	Kalmar	0–0	AIK	Kalmar
17:30 CEST (UTC+2)	Antonsson (yellow card) 9'; Nouri (yellow card) 67'; Cramer (yellow card) 90+3'	Report	Hauksson (yellow card) 9'; Bahoui (yellow card) 89'	Stadium: Guldfågeln Arena; Attendance: 8,479; Referee: Per Melin

12 July 2015 15	AIK	4–1	GIF Sundsvall	Stockholm
17:30 CEST (UTC+2)	Goitom 19', 72' (yellow card) 72'; Johansson (yellow card) 39'; Bangura 45+1'; Brustad 85'	Report	Dibba 4'; Sigurjónsson (yellow card) 34'; Fjóluson (yellow card) 81'	Stadium: Friends Arena; Attendance: 11,387; Referee: Stefan Johannesson

19 July 2015 16	Helsingborg	3–1	AIK	Helsingborg
17:30 CEST (UTC+2)	Simović (yellow card) 17'; J.Larsson 21', 61'; P.Larsson (yellow card) 64'; Wede (yellow card) 77'; Smárason 89'	Report	Etuhu (yellow card) 36'; Pavey (yellow card) 42'; Gotiom 60'	Stadium: Olympia; Attendance: 8,437; Referee: Martin Hansson

26 July 2015 17	AIK	4–2	Elfsborg	Stockholm
17:30 CEST (UTC+2)	Goitom 10', 40'; Bangura 23'; Etuhu (yellow card) 31'; Pereira 35'	Report	Holmén (yellow card) 11'; Hedlund (yellow card) 42'; Prodell 63'; Lundevall 79'; Svensson (yellow card) 82'	Stadium: Friends Arena; Attendance: 14,122; Referee: Mohammed Al-Hakim

2 August 2015 18	IFK Norrköping	1–2	AIK	Norrköping
15:00 CEST (UTC+2)	Sjölund (yellow card) 28'; Wahlqvist 68'	Report	Bangura 25'; Goitom 59'; Carlgren (yellow card) 86'	Stadium: Nya Parken; Attendance: 14,711; Referee: Mohammed Al-Hakim

10 August 2015 19	AIK	1–0	Djurgården	Stockholm
19:05 CEST (UTC+2)	Sonko Sundberg (red card) 32'; Bangura 64'; Johansson (yellow card) 90+5'	Report	Arvidsson (yellow card) 63' (yellow-red card) 74'	Stadium: Friends Arena; Attendance: 39,387; Referee: Markus Strömbergsson

16 August 2015 20	AIK	2–1	Kalmar	Stockholm
15:00 CEST (UTC+2)	Blomberg 10', 38'; Etuhu (yellow card) 31'; Goitom (yellow card) 32'; Ofori (yellow card) 78'	Report	Nilsson (yellow card) 31'; Agardius (yellow card) 39'; Öhman (yellow card) 66'; Eriksson 72'; Nouri (yellow card) 84'	Stadium: Friends Arena; Attendance: 15,078; Referee: Johan Hamlin

23 August 2015 21	Gefle	1–2	AIK	Gävle
15:00 CEST (UTC+2)	Williams 74'; Fällman (yellow card) 80'	Report	Johansson 41'; Blomberg 89'	Stadium: Gavlevallen; Attendance: 6,243; Referee: Mohammed Al-Hakim

30 August 2015 22	AIK	1–0	Åtvidaberg	Stockholm
15:00 CEST (UTC+2)	Johansson 32'; Hauksson (yellow card) 38'	Report	Karlsson (yellow card) 16'; Owoeri (yellow card) 35'	Stadium: Friends Arena; Attendance: 16,749; Referee: Andreas Ekberg

12 September 2015 23	Falkenberg	2–4	AIK	Falkenberg
16:00 CEST (UTC+2)	Svensson 54' (yellow card) 57'; Araba (yellow card) 71'; Rodevåg 90'	Report	Hooiveld (yellow card) 3'; Brustad 44'; Goitom 53', 65'; Bangura 75'	Stadium: Falkenbergs IP; Attendance: 4,024; Referee: Bojan Pandžić

19 September 2015 24	AIK	2–1	BK Häcken	Stockholm
16:00 CEST (UTC+2)	Brustad 20'; Etuhu 25' (yellow card) 23' (yellow-red card) 70'; Hauksson (yellow card) 61'; Blomberg (yellow card) 65'; Goitom (yellow card) 90+3'	Report	Jeremejeff 39' (yellow card) 79'; Sudić (yellow card) 73'	Stadium: Friends Arena; Attendance: 19,380; Referee: Johan Hamlin

23 September 2015 25	GIF Sundsvall	0–2	AIK	Sundsvall
19:05 CEST (UTC+2)	Olsson (yellow card) 69'; Sigurjónsson (yellow card) 84'	Report	Pereira 38'; Hooiveld 85'	Stadium: Norrporten Arena; Attendance: 6,409; Referee: Mohammed Al-Hakim

27 September 2015 26	Hammarby	1–0	AIK	Stockholm
15:00 CEST (UTC+2)	Solheim (yellow card) 37'; Magyar (yellow card) 68'; Israelsson 89'	Report	Ofori (yellow card) 45+2'; Pavey (red card) 61'	Stadium: Tele2 Arena; Attendance: 28,945; Referee: Jonas Eriksson

4 October 2015 27	AIK	2–1	Malmö	Stockholm
17:30 CEST (UTC+2)	Goitom 12'; Ishizaki 62'	Report	Rodić 45' (yellow card) 37'; Yotún (yellow card) 76'; Bengtsson (yellow card) 36' (yellow-red card) 90+4'	Stadium: Friends Arena; Attendance: 25,075; Referee: Stefan Johannesson

18 October 2015 28	Halmstad	0–1	AIK	Halmstad
15:00 CEST (UTC+2)	Westerberg (yellow card) 75'; Fagercrantz (yellow card) 90+5'	Report	Johansson (yellow card) 15'; Khan 90+4' (o.g.); Hooiveld (yellow card) 90+7'	Stadium: Örjans Vall; Attendance: 5,962; Referee: Glenn Nyberg

26 October 2015 29	AIK	1–2	IFK Göteborg	Stockholm
19:05 CEST (UTC+2)	Goitom 19'; Pereira (yellow card) 29'; Hauksson (yellow card) 34'; Ishizaki (yellow card) 81'; Hooiveld (yellow card) 90+3'	Report	Engvall 21', 59'; Ankersen (yellow card) 29'	Stadium: Friends Arena; Attendance: 43,713; Referee: Andreas Ekberg

31 October 2015 30	Örebro	1–1	AIK	Örebro
13:00 CET (UTC+1)	Broberg 40'; Sigurbjörnsson (yellow card) 63'	Report	Johansson (yellow card) 37'; Blomberg (yellow card) 58'; Goitom 60'	Stadium: Behrn Arena; Attendance: 10,293; Referee: Bojan Pandžić

=== Svenska Cupen ===
==== 2014–15 ====
===== Group stage =====
Pos	Team	Pld	W	D	L	GF	GA	GD	Pts	Qualification
1	Hammarby IF	3	2	1	0	4	2	+2	7	Advance to Knockout stage
2	AIK	3	2	0	1	8	2	+6	6	
3	Landskrona BoIS	3	1	1	1	3	6	−3	4	
4	Kristianstads FF	3	0	0	3	1	6	−5	0	

Source: svenskfotboll.se (in Swedish)
Rules for classification: 1) Points; 2) Goal difference; 3) Number of goals scored; 4) Head-to-head record; 5) Highest ranked team

21 February 2015 1	AIK	4–0	Landskrona BoIS	Stockholm
13:00 CET (UTC+1)	Etuhu (yellow card) 37'; Johansson 39'; Sundberg 45+2' (yellow card) 87'; Goitom 60'; Bangura 73'	Report	Ekvall (yellow card) 77'	Stadium: Grimsta IP; Attendance: 3,015; Referee: Stefan Johannesson

28 February 2015 2	Kristianstad	0–3	AIK	Kristianstad
14:00 CET (UTC+1)	Möllestam (yellow card) 15'; Johansson (yellow card) 41'; Ejupi (yellow card) 71'	Report	Väisänen 28'; Etuhu (yellow card) 41'; Lundholm 50'; Bahoui 59' (pen.)	Stadium: Kristianstads IP; Attendance: 1,982; Referee: Andreas Ekberg

7 March 2015 3	AIK	1–2	Hammarby	Stockholm
13:00 CET (UTC+1)	Goitom 8' (yellow card) 31'; Bahoui (yellow card) 13'; Blomberg (yellow card) 21'; Hauksson (yellow card) 45'; Etuhu (yellow card) 45'; Johansson (yellow card) 90'	Report	Bakircioglu 15' (pen.); Solli (yellow card) 25'; Persson 62'; Batan (yellow card) 90'	Stadium: Friends Arena; Attendance: 41,063; Referee: Michael Lerjéus

==== 2015–16 ====
19 August 2015 Second round	Ekerö	0–6	AIK	Ekerö
19:30 CEST (UTC+2)	Forsell (yellow card) 41'; Ikoro (yellow card) 43'	Report	Brustad 45+1', 57'; Bangura 51'; Salétros 83'; Eliasson 85'; Goitom 90+1'	Stadium: Träkvistavallen; Attendance: 4,308; Referee: Johan Krantz

=== UEFA Europa League ===
==== Qualifying rounds ====
2 July 2015 First qualifying round 1st leg	VPS (Finland)	2–2	(Sweden) AIK	Oulu, Finland
19:00 CEST (UTC+2)	Ćatović 45+3'; Seabrook 65'	Report	Ofori (yellow card) 37'; Johansson (yellow card) 47'; Bahoui 70', 83' (pen.)	Stadium: Raatti Stadium; Attendance: 2,180; Referee: Ionuț Avram (Romania)
Note: VPS played their home match at Raatti Stadium, Oulu, instead of their regular stadium Hietalahti Stadium, Vaasa.

9 July 2015 First qualifying round 2nd leg	AIK (Sweden)	4–0 (6–2 agg.)	(Finland) VPS	Stockholm, Sweden
19:00 CEST (UTC+2)	Goitom 14', 59'; Bangura 54'; Ofori 85'	Report		Stadium: Friends Arena; Attendance: 8,430; Referee: Gunnar Jarl Jónsson (Iceland)

16 July 2015 Second qualifying round 1st leg	AIK (Sweden)	2–0	(Armenia) Shirak	Stockholm, Sweden
19:00 CEST (UTC+2)	Karlsson (yellow card) 9'; Goitom 29', 83' (pen.) (yellow card) 63'; Bangura (yellow card) 62'	Report	Aleksanyan (yellow card) 53'; Stamenković (yellow card) 54'; A.Hovhannisyan (yellow card) 7' (yellow-red card) 69'; Malakyan (yellow card) 62' (yellow-red card) 80'; G.Hovhannisyan (yellow card) 83'; Bougouhi (yellow card) 84'; Barikyan (red card) 85'	Stadium: Tele2 Arena; Attendance: 7,315; Referee: Vladimir Vnuk (Slovakia)
Note: AIK played their second qualifying round home match at Tele2 Arena, Stockholm, instead of their regular stadium Friends Arena, Solna, as the arena was booked for an AC/DC concert.

23 July 2015 Second qualifying round 2nd leg	Shirak (Armenia)	0–2 (0–4 agg.)	(Sweden) AIK	Gyumri, Armenia
14:30 CEST (UTC+2)	Bougouhi (yellow card) 68'; Davtyan (yellow card) 79'; Mikaelyan (yellow card) 81'	Report	Goitom 14'; Ishizaki 25'; Ofori (yellow card) 58'; Eliasson (yellow card) 81'	Stadium: City Stadium; Attendance: 2,820; Referee: Sándor Andó-Szabó (Hungary)

30 July 2015 Third qualifying round 1st leg	AIK (Sweden)	1–3	(Greece) Atromitos	Stockholm, Sweden
19:00 CEST (UTC+2)	Etuhu (yellow card) 45+3'; Ofori (yellow card) 60'; Gotiom 70' (pen.); Sundberg (red card) 79'; Pavey (yellow card) 90'	Report	Napoleoni 3'; Marcelinho 15'; Godoy (yellow card) 26'; Fytanidis (yellow card) 49'; Pitu (yellow card) 49'; Kivrakidis (yellow card) 70'; Bíttolo (yellow card) 71'; Umbides 80' (pen.)	Stadium: Friends Arena; Attendance: 9,771; Referee: Christian Dingert (Germany)

6 August 2015 Third qualifying round 2nd leg	Atromitos (Greece)	1–0 (4–1 agg.)	(Sweden) AIK	Athens, Greece
21:00 CEST (UTC+2)	Fytanidis (yellow card) 35'; Marcelinho 67'	Report	Salétros (yellow card) 40'	Stadium: Peristeri Stadium; Attendance: 2,587; Referee: Artyom Kuchin (Kazakhstan)

== Squad statistics ==
As of match played 31 October 2015

=== Appearances and goals ===
No.	Pos	Nat	Player	Total		Allsvenskan		2014–15 Svenska Cupen		2015–16 Svenska Cupen		UEFA Europa League	
No.	Pos	Nat	Player	Apps	Goals	Apps	Goals	Apps	Goals	Apps	Goals	Apps	Goals
3	DF	(Sweden) SWE	Per Karlsson	28	0	24	0	1	0	0	0	3	0
4	DF	(Sweden) SWE	Nils-Eric Johansson	39	4	29	3	3	1	1	0	6	0
7	MF	(Norway) NOR	Fredrik Brustad	35	7	12+15	5	2	0	1	2	4+1	0
8	MF	(Sweden) SWE	Johan Blomberg	39	6	25+4	6	3	0	0+1	0	4+2	0
9	FW	(Sweden) SWE	Marko Nikolić	6	0	0+3	0	0	0	1	0	0+2	0
10	FW	(Eritrea) ERI	Henok Goitom	39	27	28+1	18	3	2	0+1	1	5+1	6
12	DF	(Iceland) ISL	Haukur Hauksson	30	0	23	0	3	0	0	0	4	0
13	GK	(Canada) CAN	Kyriakos Stamatopoulos	8	0	3	0	2	0	1	0	2	0
14	MF	(England) ENG	Kenny Pavey	20	0	5+11	0	0	0	1	0	3	0
16	DF	(Brazil) BRA	Alex Pereira	18	2	9+5	2	0	0	0	0	3+1	0
17	MF	(Ghana) GHA	Ebenezer Ofori	36	1	27	0	3	0	1	0	5	1
18	DF	(Sweden) SWE	Noah Sundberg	32	2	16+8	1	2	1	1	0	5	0
20	MF	(Nigeria) NGR	Dickson Etuhu	30	2	18+3	2	3	0	0	0	6	0
23	FW	(Sierra Leone) SLE	Mohamed Bangura	39	11	26+4	8	0+3	1	1	1	3+2	1
24	MF	(Sweden) SWE	Stefan Ishizaki	13	2	9	1	0	0	0	0	4	1
26	DF	(Netherlands) NED	Jos Hooiveld	11	0	11	0	0	0	0	0	0	0
28	MF	(Sweden) SWE	Niclas Eliasson	17	1	3+7	0	1	0	1	1	3+2	0
29	MF	(Sweden) SWE	Anton Salétros	26	1	6+14	0	0+1	0	1	1	1+3	0
31	MF	(Sweden) SWE	Christos Gravius	2	0	0+1	0	0	0	0+1	0	0	0
32	DF	(Ghana) GHA	Patrick Kpozo	1	0	0	0	0	0	1	0	0	0
34	GK	(Sweden) SWE	Oscar Linnér	4	0	2	0	0	0	0	0	1+1	0
35	GK	(Sweden) SWE	Patrik Carlgren	29	0	25	0	1	0	0	0	3	0
Players away on loan:
2	DF	(Finland) FIN	Sauli Väisänen	9	2	4+2	1	3	1	0	0	0	0
Players who appeared for AIK but left during the season:
5	MF	(Sweden) SWE	Panajotis Dimitriadis	11	0	9	0	0+2	0	0	0	0	0
11	MF	(Sweden) SWE	Nabil Bahoui	12	8	9	5	2	1	0	0	1	2
25	MF	(Sweden) SWE	Sam Lundholm	18	1	7+6	0	1+2	1	0	0	0+2	0

=== Goal scorers ===
Place	Position	Nation	Number	Name	Allsvenskan	2014–15 Svenska Cupen	2015–16 Svenska Cupen	UEFA Europa League	Total
1	FW	(Eritrea)	36	Henok Goitom	18	2	1	6	27
2	FW	(Sierra Leone)	23	Mohamed Bangura	8	1	1	1	11
3	MF	(Sweden)	11	Nabil Bahoui	5	1	0	2	8
4	MF	(Sweden)	8	Johan Blomberg	6	0	0	0	6
4	MF	(Norway)	7	Fredrik Brustad	5	0	1	0	6
6	DF	(Sweden)	4	Nils-Eric Johansson	3	1	0	0	4
7	DF	(Brazil)	16	Alex Pereira	2	0	0	0	2
7	MF	(Nigeria)	20	Dickson Etuhu	2	0	0	0	2
7	DF	(Finland)	2	Sauli Väisänen	1	1	0	0	2
7	DF	(Sweden)	18	Noah Sundberg	1	1	0	0	2
7	MF	(Sweden)	24	Stefan Ishizaki	1	0	0	1	2
12	DF	(Netherlands)	26	Jos Hooiveld	1	0	0	0	1
12	MF	(Sweden)	25	Sam Lundholm	0	1	0	0	1
12	MF	(Sweden)	29	Anton Salétros	0	0	1	0	1
12	MF	(Sweden)	28	Niclas Eliasson	0	0	1	0	1
12	MF	(Ghana)	17	Ebenezer Ofori	0	0	0	1	1
12				Own goal	1	0	0	0	1
TOTALS					54	8	6	11	79

=== Clean sheets ===
Place	Position	Nation	Number	Name	Allsvenskan	2014–15 Svenska Cupen	2015–16 Svenska Cupen	UEFA Europa League	Total
1	GK	(Sweden)	35	Patrik Carlgren	8	0	0	0	8
2	GK	(Canada)	13	Kyriakos Stamatopoulos	0	2	1	2	5
3	GK	(Sweden)	34	Oscar Linnér	1	0	0	1	2
TOTALS					9	2	1	3	15

=== Disciplinary record ===
Number	Nation	Position	Name	Allsvenskan		2014–15 Svenska Cupen		2015–16 Svenska Cupen		UEFA Europa League		Total	
Number	Nation	Position	Name	Yellow card	Red card	Yellow card	Red card	Yellow card	Red card	Yellow card	Red card	Yellow card	Red card
3	(Sweden)	DF	Per Karlsson	0	0	0	0	0	0	1	0	1	0
4	(Sweden)	DF	Nils-Eric Johansson	4	0	1	0	0	0	1	0	5	0
8	(Sweden)	MF	Johan Blomberg	5	0	1	0	0	0	0	0	6	0
10	(Eritrea)	FW	Henok Goitom	3	0	1	0	0	0	1	0	5	0
12	(Iceland)	DF	Haukur Hauksson	6	0	1	0	0	0	0	0	7	0
14	(England)	MF	Kenny Pavey	2	1	0	0	0	0	1	0	3	1
16	(Brazil)	DF	Alex Pereira	2	0	0	0	0	0	0	0	2	0
17	(Ghana)	MF	Ebenezer Ofori	6	0	0	0	0	0	3	0	9	0
18	(Sweden)	DF	Noah Sundberg	2	1	2	0	0	0	0	0	3	1
20	(Nigeria)	MF	Dickson Etuhu	5	1	3	0	0	0	1	0	9	1
23	(Sierra Leone)	FW	Mohamed Bangura	0	0	0	0	0	1	0	0	1	0
24	(Sweden)	MF	Stefan Ishizaki	1	0	0	0	0	0	0	0	1	0
26	(Netherlands)	DF	Jos Hooiveld	3	0	0	0	0	0	0	0	3	0
28	(Sweden)	MF	Niclas Eliasson	0	0	0	0	0	1	0	0	1	0
29	(Sweden)	MF	Anton Salétros	1	0	0	0	0	0	1	0	2	0
35	(Sweden)	GK	Patrik Carlgren	2	0	0	0	0	0	0	0	2	0
Players away on loan:
2	(Finland)	DF	Sauli Väisänen	3	0	0	0	0	0	0	0	3	0
Players who left AIK during the season:
11	(Sweden)	MF	Nabil Bahoui	3	0	1	0	0	0	0	0	4	0
25	(Sweden)	MF	Sam Lundholm	1	0	0	0	0	0	0	0	1	0
Total				49	3	9	0	0	0	9	0	67	3
