= 2015 Örebro SK season =

Örebro SK
- Full name: Örebro Sportklubb
- Founded: 28 October 1908; 118 years ago
- Ground: Behrn Arena, Örebro
- Capacity: 12,300
- Chairman: Björn Åqvist
- Head coach: Alexander Axén
- League: Allsvenskan
- 2014: Allsvenskan, 6th
- Website: https://oskfotboll.se/
Home colours	Away colours

Örebro SK are a Swedish football team which based in Örebro. During the 2014/15 campaign they competed in the Allsvenskan, Swedish Cup.

== Allsvenskan ==
5 April 2015 Match 1	IFK Norrköping	1–1	Örebro SK	Norrköping
17:30	Nyman 6'; Sjölund (yellow card) 39'	Summary	Sigurbjörnsson (yellow card) 25'; Persson 62'; Valgarðsson (yellow card) 79'	Stadium: Nya Parken; Attendance: 8,220; Referee: (Sweden) Stefan Johannesson

8 April 2015 Match 2	Örebro SK	0–2	IFK Göteborg	Örebro
19:00	Holmberg (yellow card) 52'; Gerzić (yellow card) 68'; Valgarðsson (yellow card) 72'	Summary	Salomonsson 34'; Aleesami (yellow card) 68'; Ankersen (yellow card) 81'; Vibe 88'	Stadium: Behrn Arena; Attendance: 8,121; Referee: (Sweden) Glenn Nyberg

12 April 2015 Match 3	Falkenberg	2–0	Örebro SK	Falkenberg
15:00	Eriksson 25'; Vall 90'	Summary		Stadium: Falkenbergs IP; Attendance: 2,070; Referee: (Sweden) Kristoffer Karlsson

20 April 2015 Match 4	Örebro SK	1–3	GIF Sundsvall	Örebro
19:00	Sigurbjörnsson (yellow card) 52'; Yasin 54' (pen.)	Summary	Dibba 3'; Sellin 19'; Helg 50'; Lundström (yellow card) 72'	Stadium: Behrn Arena; Attendance: 5,908; Referee: (Sweden) Markus Strömbergsson

26 April 2015 Match 5	AIK	3–0	Örebro SK	Solna Municipality
17:30	Bahoui 30'; Goitom 35'; Brustad 71'	Summary	Björnquist (yellow card) 20' (yellow-red card)	Stadium: Friends Arena; Attendance: 14,331; Referee: (Sweden) Andreas Ekberg

30 April 2015 Match 6	Örebro SK	2–2	Hammarby IF	Örebro
19:00	Haginge 15'; Pode (yellow card) 55'; Yasin 79' (pen.); Persson (yellow card) 90'; Gerzić (yellow card) 90'	Summary	Söderqvist (yellow card) 13'; Solheim 43'; Sævarsson 64'; Batan (yellow card) 78'; Israelsson (yellow card) 90'	Stadium: Behrn Arena; Attendance: 10,486; Referee: (Sweden) Michael Lerjéus

4 May 2015 Match 7	Kalmar FF	3–0	Örebro SK	Kalmar
19:00	Eriksson 25' (pen.); Antonsson 44'; Elm (yellow card) 46'; Elm 63'	Summary	Haginge (yellow card) 26'	Stadium: Guldfågeln Arena; Attendance: 3,703; Referee: (Sweden) Stefan Johannesson

10 May 2015 Match 8	BK Häcken	2–0	Örebro SK	Gothenburg
17:30	Nasiru 29'; Gustafson 37'	Summary	Nkili (yellow card) 85'	Stadium: Gamla Ullevi; Attendance: 1,431; Referee: (Sweden) Johan Hamlin

20 May 2015 Match 9	Örebro SK	2–1	Åtvidaberg	Örebro
19:00	Gustavsson 9'; Sigurbjörnsson 14'; Persson (yellow card) 45'	Summary	Skrabb 20' (yellow card) 53'; Nordenberg (yellow card) 53'	Stadium: Behrn Arena; Attendance: 5,202; Referee: (Sweden) Kristoffer Karlsson

24 May 2015 Match 10	Örebro SK	1–0	Gefle IF	Örebro
15:00	Gustavsson 39'; Sigurbjörnsson (yellow card) 52'; Moberg (yellow card) 53'; Yasin (yellow card) 90'	Summary	Williams (yellow card) 24'	Stadium: Behrn Arena; Attendance: 5,217; Referee: (Sweden) Michael Lerjéus

31 May 2015 Match 11	IF Elfsborg	2–2	Örebro SK	Borås
17:30	Frick (yellow card) 45'; Rohdén (yellow card) 61'; Nilsson 70'; Hauger 90'	Summary	Pode 31'; Gustavsson 85'; Jansson (yellow card) 89'	Stadium: Borås Arena; Attendance: 7,167; Referee: (Sweden) Bojan Pandžić

3 June 2015 Match 12	Örebro SK	0–0	Helsingborgs IF	Örebro
19:00		Summary	Ajdarević (yellow card) 85'	Stadium: Behrn Arena; Attendance: 6,102; Referee: (Sweden) Stefan Johannesson

6 June 2015 Match 13	Örebro SK	1–1	Halmstads BK	Örebro
16:00	Gerzić 47'	Summary	Liverstam (yellow card) 46'; Keene (yellow card) 54'; Gyan 55'	Stadium: Behrn Arena; Attendance: 5,129; Referee: (Sweden) Markus Strömbergsson

4 July 2015 Match 14	Djurgårdens IF	2–0	Örebro SK	Stockholm
16:00	Berntsen 6' (yellow card) 36'; Johnson 24'	Summary	Sigurbjörnsson (yellow card) 59'; Moberg (yellow card) 79'	Stadium: Tele2 Arena; Attendance: 13,809; Referee: (Sweden) Stefan Johannesson

11 July 2015 Match 15	Malmö FF	2–2	Örebro SK	Malmö
16:00	Cibicki 13'; Berget (yellow card) 26'; Mehmeti 90+6'	Summary	Gustavsson 16'; Holmberg 32'; Haginge (yellow card) 89'	Stadium: Swedbank Stadion; Attendance: 13,073; Referee: (Sweden) Kristoffer Karlsson

18 July 2015 Match 16	Örebro SK	1–1	Malmö FF	Örebro
16:00	Nordmark 54'	Summary	Rosenberg 68'	Stadium: Behrn Arena; Attendance: 6,753; Referee: (Sweden) Markus Strömbergsson

27 July 2015 Match 17	Örebro SK	0–1	Djurgårdens IF	Örebro
19:05	Sigurbjörnsson (yellow card) 45'; Pode (yellow card) 52'; Åhman Persson (yellow card) 56'	Summary	Colley (yellow card) 34'; Mushekwi (yellow card) 61'; Arvidsson 77'	Stadium: Behrn Arena; Attendance: 11,171; Referee: (Sweden) Johan Hamlin

2 August 2015 Match 18	IFK Göteborg	6–0	Örebro SK	Gothenburg
17:30	Engvall 15' 44' (yellow card) 76'; Boman 19'; Ankersen 25' 83'; Rieks 49'	Summary	Wiktorsson (yellow card) 38'; Moberg (yellow card) 76'	Stadium: Gamla Ullevi; Attendance: 11,281; Referee: (Sweden) Markus Strömbergsson

9 August 2015 Match 19	Örebro SK	1–3	IFK Norrköping	Örebro
15:00 CET	Pode (yellow card) 25'; Broberg 61'	Summary	Traustason 20'; Wiklander (yellow card) 25'; Sjölund (yellow card) 28'; Wahlqvist (yellow card) 37'; Nyman 39'; Kujović 63'	Stadium: Behrn Arena; Attendance: 7,405; Referee: (Sweden) Kristoffer Karlsson

15 August 2015 Match 20	GIF Sundsvall	1–0	Örebro SK	Sundsvall
16:00 CET	Sellin (red card) 58'; Sigurjónsson 70' (yellow card) 76'	Summary	Åhman Persson (yellow card) 62'; Björnquist (yellow card) 73'	Stadium: Norrporten Arena; Attendance: 4,464; Referee: (Sweden) Nermin Cisic

23 August 2015 Match 21	Halmstads BK	2–2	Örebro SK	Halmstad
17:30 CET	Smith (yellow card) 5'; Rusike 49'; Rojas 60' (yellow card) 88'	Summary	Broberg 14'; Sigurbjörnsson (yellow card) 38'; Ericsson 58'; Ajdarević (yellow card) 78'	Stadium: Örjans Vall; Attendance: 3,514; Referee: (Sweden) Markus Strömbergsson

29 August 2015 Match 22	Örebro SK	2–0	BK Häcken	Örebro
16:00 CET	Broberg 2'; Gustavsson 90+3'	Summary	Andersson (yellow card) 65'; Zuta (yellow card) 75'	Stadium: Behrn Arena; Attendance: 4,954; Referee: (Sweden) Jonas Eriksson (referee)

13 September 2015 Match 23	Hammarby IF	1–2	Örebro SK	Stockholm
15:00 CET	Orlov 16'; Torsteinbø (yellow card) 50'	Summary	Moberg (yellow card) 20'; Ericsson 22'; Ajdarević 35'	Stadium: Tele2 Arena; Attendance: 21,862; Referee: (Sweden) Andreas Ekberg

21 September 2015 Match 24	Örebro SK	4–2	IF Elfsborg	Örebro
19:05 CET	Broberg 30' 37' 65' (yellow card) 80'; Persson (yellow card) 67'; Gustavsson 77' (yellow card) 83'	Summary	Svensson (yellow card) 40' (goal) 43'; Frick (yellow card) 76' (goal) 80'	Stadium: Behrn Arena; Attendance: 7,192; Referee: (Sweden) Kristoffer Karlsson

24 September 2015 Match 25	Helsingborgs IF	0–2	Örebro SK	Helsingborg
19:00 CET	Hansson (yellow card) 3'	Summary	Ajdarević (yellow card) 40'; Ericsson 70'; Nordmark 85'	Stadium: Olympia; Attendance: 6,439; Referee: (Sweden) Markus Strömbergsson

28 September 2015 Match 26	Örebro SK	2–1	Kalmar FF	Örebro
19:00 CET	Broberg 1' 35'; Wiktorsson (yellow card) 55'	Summary	Romarinho (yellow card) 32' (goal) 33'; Elm (yellow card) 76'	Stadium: Behrn Arena; Attendance: 6,259; Referee: (Sweden) Johan Hamlin

3 October 2015 Match 27	Örebro SK	2–1	Falkenberg	Örebro
16:00 CET	Holmberg 17'; Broberg 56'	Summary	Nilsson 3' (pen.); Araba (yellow card) 80'	Stadium: Behrn Arena; Attendance: 5,915; Referee: (Sweden) Markus Strömbergsson

19 October 2015 Match 28	Gefle IF	2–2	Örebro SK	Gävle
19:00 CET	Lantto 51'; Oremo 62'	Summary	Holmberg 26' 53'	Stadium: Gavlevallen; Attendance: 2,601; Referee: (Sweden) Johan Hamlin

26 October 2015 Match 29	Åtvidaberg	v	Örebro SK	Åtvidaberg
19:00 CET				Stadium: Kopparvallen
