= 2015 Allsvenskan =

91st season of Allsvenskan

Allsvenskan
- Season: 2015
- Champions: IFK Norrköping; 13th Allsvenskan title 13th Swedish title
- Relegated: Halmstads BK; Åtvidabergs FF
- Champions League: IFK Norrköping
- Europa League: IFK Göteborg; AIK; BK Häcken (via Svenska Cupen)
- Matches: 240
- Goals: 674 (2.81 per match)
- Top goalscorer: Emir Kujović (21 goals)
- Best goalkeeper: John Alvbåge (81 save %)
- Biggest home win: IFK Göteborg 6–0 Örebro SK (2 August 2015); Falkenbergs FF 6–0 Åtvidabergs FF (18 October 2015)
- Biggest away win: IFK Norrköping 0–4 IF Elfsborg (13 April 2015)
- Highest scoring: AIK 4–3 Falkenbergs FF (3 June 2015); Malmö FF 4–3 Falkenbergs FF (23 September 2015); BK Häcken 5–2 IF Elfsborg (25 October 2015)
- Longest winning run: 9 matches AIK
- Longest unbeaten run: 15 matches Djurgårdens IF
- Longest winless run: 18 matches Åtvidabergs FF
- Longest losing run: 6 matches Åtvidabergs FF
- Highest attendance: 43,713; AIK 1–2 IFK Göteborg (26 October 2015)
- Lowest attendance: 1,431; BK Häcken 2–0 Örebro SK (10 May 2015)
- Total attendance: 2,392,098
- Average attendance: 9,967

The 2015 Allsvenskan season, was the 91st edition of top tier Allsvenskan football competition since its founding in 1924 under the authority of the Swedish Football Association in Sweden; the 2015 Swedish football season. 16 teams contested the league; 14 returning from the 2014 season and two that were promoted from Superettan. The 2015 fixtures were released on 21 January 2015. The season started on 4 April 2015, when BK Häcken visited newly promoted Hammarby IF at Tele2 Arena and ended on 31 October 2015.

Malmö FF unsuccessfully defended its 2014 title losing to IFK Norrköping in the 2015 title final on 31 October 2015, 2–0. IFK Norrköping would win the title with a margin of three points ahead of IFK Göteborg and five points clear of third-placed team AIK. The 2015 title enabled IFK Norrköping a guaranteed place to contest in the second qualifying round the 2016–17 UEFA Champions League tournament; runners-up IFK Göteborg and third-placed AIK would compete in first qualifying round of 2016–17 UEFA Europa League. The fourth-placed team Elfsborg would play in Europa League if they or one of the top three teams won 2015–16 Svenska Cupen.

== Summary ==
=== Background ===
The annual pre-season kick-off meeting was held at Scandic Infra City in Upplands Väsby on 23 March 2015. Managers and key players from the major teams as well as some of the predicted bottom teams will be interviewed by representatives from the media as well as commentators from C More Entertainment, the official broadcasters of the league.

=== Season overview ===
The season started on 4 April 2015 with two fixtures, an early afternoon fixture between newcomers Hammarby IF and last year's fifth placed team BK Häcken at Tele2 Arena in Stockholm followed by the match between Kalmar FF and Helsingborgs IF at Guldfågeln Arena. The rest of the fixtures of the first round were spread out during the two following days. The defending champions Malmö FF will start the season with an away fixture against newcomers GIF Sundsvall at Norrporten Arena on 6 April 2015. The first few match weeks include a number of high-profile matches, Malmö FF faced last years third placed team AIK in a home fixture on 9 April 2015 and last year's runners-up IFK Göteborg in an away fixture on match day three on 12 April 2015. Matchday seven featured both a Scanian derby between Malmö FF and Helsingborg on 3 May 2015 and a Stockholm derby between AIK and Hammarby on 4 May 2015.

During the 26th round of play, a record was set as the total attendance for the season surpassed 2 million spectators. The previous record of 1,956,042 spectators was set in 1957–58.

=== Allsvenskans stora pris ===
For the third year running, the broadcaster of Allsvenskan, C More Entertainment, hosted an award ceremony where they presented seven awards and two special awards to the players and staff of the 16 Allsvenskan clubs, the award ceremony was held on 5 November 2015. The nominations for the 2015 season were officially announced on 2 November 2015. Nominees are displayed below, the winners are marked in bold text. IFK Norrköping received the most nominations with six nominations while AIK received five nominations and IFK Göteborg received four nominations. Djurgårdens IF and IF Elfsborg received two nominations and Falkenbergs FF and Malmö FF received one nomination each.

Goalkeeper of the year

- **John Alvbåge** (IFK Göteborg)
- Patrik Carlgren (AIK)
- Kevin Stuhr Ellegaard (IF Elfsborg)

Defender of the year

- **Andreas Johansson** (IFK Norrköping)
- Haitam Aleesami (IFK Göteborg)
- Emil Salomonsson (IFK Göteborg)

Midfielder of the year

- **Ebenezer Ofori** (AIK)
- Daniel Sjölund (IFK Norrköping)
- Viktor Claesson (IF Elfsborg)

Forward of the year

- **Emir Kujović** (IFK Norrköping)
- Henok Goitom (AIK)
- Markus Rosenberg (Malmö FF)

Newcomer of the year

- **Kerim Mrabti** (Djurgårdens IF)
- Sam Johnson (Djurgårdens IF)
- Gustaf Nilsson (Falkenbergs FF)

Manager of the year

- **Jan Andersson** (IFK Norrköping)
- Jörgen Lennartsson (IFK Göteborg)
- Andreas Alm (AIK)

Most valuable player of the year

- **Henok Goitom** (AIK)
- Emir Kujović (IFK Norrköping)
- Andreas Johansson (IFK Norrköping)

== Teams ==
A total of sixteen teams will contest the league, including fourteen sides from the 2014 season and two promoted teams from the 2014 Superettan. Both of the promoted teams for the 2014 season managed to stay in the league, Falkenbergs FF and Örebro SK.

Mjällby AIF and IF Brommapojkarna were relegated at the end of the 2014 season after finishing in the bottom two places of the table. They were replaced by 2014 Superettan champions Hammarby IF and runners-up GIF Sundsvall. Hammarby returned to Allsvenskan after five years absence, having been relegated at the end of the 2009 season. This was Hammarby's 47th season in the league. Sundsvall returned to Allsvenskan after two years absence, having been relegated at the end of the 2012 season. This was Sundsvall's 15th season in the league.

Gefle IF as 14th-placed team retained their Allsvenskan spot after winning against third-placed Superettan team Ljungskile SK 4–1 on aggregate in a relegation/promotion playoff.

=== Stadia and locations ===
Location of teams in 2015 Allsvenskan

| Team | Location | Stadium | Turf^{1} | Stadium capacity^{1} |
|---|---|---|---|---|
| AIK | Stockholm | Friends Arena | Natural | 50,000 |
| BK Häcken | Gothenburg | Gamla Ullevi (Until 6 June 2015) | Natural | 18,600 |
| BK Häcken | Gothenburg | Bravida Arena (From 5 July 2015) | Artificial | 6,500 |
| Djurgårdens IF | Stockholm | Tele2 Arena | Artificial | 30,000 |
| Falkenbergs FF | Falkenberg | Falkenbergs IP | Natural | 4,000 |
| Gefle IF | Gävle | Strömvallen (Until 30 April 2015) | Artificial | 7,200 |
| Gefle IF | Gävle | Gavlevallen (From 20 May 2015) | Artificial | 6,500 |
| GIF Sundsvall | Sundsvall | Norrporten Arena | Artificial | 7,700 |
| Halmstads BK | Halmstad | Örjans Vall | Natural | 15,500 |
| Hammarby IF | Stockholm | Tele2 Arena | Artificial | 30,000 |
| Helsingborgs IF | Helsingborg | Olympia | Natural | 16,500^{2} |
| IF Elfsborg | Borås | Borås Arena | Artificial | 16,899 |
| IFK Göteborg | Gothenburg | Gamla Ullevi | Natural | 18,600 |
| IFK Norrköping | Norrköping | Nya Parken | Artificial | 15,734 |
| Kalmar FF | Kalmar | Guldfågeln Arena | Natural | 12,000 |
| Malmö FF | Malmö | Swedbank Stadion | Natural | 24,000 |
| Åtvidabergs FF | Åtvidaberg | Kopparvallen | Artificial | 8,100 |
| Örebro SK | Örebro | Behrn Arena | Artificial | 12,300 |

- ^{1} According to each club information page at the Swedish Football Association website for Allsvenskan.
- ^{2} The capacity of Olympia will be reduced during the season due to major stadium renovations.

=== Personnel and kits ===
Note: Flags indicate national team as has been defined under FIFA eligibility rules. Players and Managers may hold more than one non-FIFA nationality.

| Team | Head coach^{1} | Captain | Kit manufacturer | Main shirt sponsor |
|---|---|---|---|---|
| AIK | (Sweden) Andreas Alm | (Sweden) Nils-Eric Johansson | Adidas | Åbro |
| BK Häcken | (Sweden) Peter Gerhardsson | (Sweden) Martin Ericsson | Nike | BRA Bygg |
| Djurgårdens IF | (Sweden) Per Olsson | (Sweden) Emil Bergström | Adidas | Prioritet Finans |
| Falkenbergs FF | (Sweden) Hans Eklund | (Sweden) David Svensson | Nike | Gekås Ullared |
| Gefle IF | (Sweden) Roger Sandberg | (Sweden) David Fällman | Umbro | Sandvik |
| GIF Sundsvall | (Sweden) Joel Cedergren (Sweden) Roger Franzén | (Sweden) Tommy Naurin | Adidas | Various |
| Halmstads BK | (Sweden) Jan Jönsson | (Sweden) Fredrik Liverstam | Puma | Prioritet Finans |
| Hammarby IF | (Sweden) Nanne Bergstrand | (Sweden) Kennedy Bakircioglu | Puma | LW |
| Helsingborgs IF | (Sweden) Henrik Larsson | (Sweden) Peter Larsson | Puma | Resurs Bank |
| IF Elfsborg | (Sweden) Magnus Haglund | (Denmark) Kevin Stuhr Ellegaard | Umbro | Various |
| IFK Göteborg | (Sweden) Jörgen Lennartsson | (Sweden) Mattias Bjärsmyr | Adidas | Prioritet Finans |
| IFK Norrköping | (Sweden) Janne Andersson | (Sweden) Andreas Johansson | Nike | Holmen |
| Kalmar FF | (Sweden) Peter Swärdh | (Sweden) David Elm | Puma | Småländska Hjältevadshus |
| Malmö FF | (Norway) Åge Hareide | (Sweden) Markus Rosenberg | Puma | Rörläggaren |
| Åtvidabergs FF | (Sweden) Roar Hansen | (Sweden) Daniel Hallingström | Uhlsport | Various |
| Örebro SK | (Sweden) Alexander Axén | (Sweden) Robert Åhman Persson | Puma | Various |

- ^{1} According to each club information page at the Swedish Football Association website for Allsvenskan.

=== Managerial changes ===
| Team | Outgoing manager | Manner of departure | Date of vacancy | Table | Incoming manager | Date of appointment |
|---|---|---|---|---|---|---|
| IFK Göteborg | (Sweden) Mikael Stahre | Sacked | 3 November 2014 | Pre-season | (Sweden) Jörgen Lennartsson | 25 November 2014 |
| Falkenbergs FF | (Sweden) Henrik Larsson | End of contract | 10 November 2014 | Pre-season | (Sweden) Hans Eklund | 26 November 2014 |
| Helsingborgs IF | (Sweden) Roar Hansen | Demoted | 10 November 2014 | Pre-season | (Sweden) Henrik Larsson | 10 November 2014 |
| IF Elfsborg | (Sweden) Janne Mian | Demoted | 12 November 2014 | Pre-season | (Sweden) Magnus Haglund | 12 November 2014 |
| Kalmar FF | (Sweden) Hans Eklund | Sacked | 14 November 2014 | Pre-season | (Sweden) Peter Swärdh | 24 November 2014 |
| Åtvidabergs FF | (Sweden) Peter Swärdh | Mutual termination | 15 November 2014 | Pre-season | (Sweden) Roar Hansen | 12 December 2014 |
| Halmstads BK | (Sweden) Jens Gustafsson | Sacked | 19 November 2014 | Pre-season | (Sweden) Jan Jönsson | 19 November 2014 |

== League table ==
| Pos | Team | Pld | W | D | L | GF | GA | GD | Pts | Qualification or relegation |
|---|---|---|---|---|---|---|---|---|---|---|
| 1 | IFK Norrköping (C) | 30 | 20 | 6 | 4 | 60 | 33 | +27 | 66 | Qualification for the Champions League second qualifying round |
| 2 | IFK Göteborg | 30 | 18 | 9 | 3 | 52 | 22 | +30 | 63 | Qualification for the Europa League first qualifying round |
| 3 | AIK | 30 | 18 | 7 | 5 | 54 | 34 | +20 | 61 | Qualification for the Europa League first qualifying round |
| 4 | IF Elfsborg | 30 | 16 | 7 | 7 | 59 | 42 | +17 | 55 | |
| 5 | Malmö FF | 30 | 15 | 9 | 6 | 54 | 34 | +20 | 54 | |
| 6 | Djurgårdens IF | 30 | 14 | 9 | 7 | 52 | 37 | +15 | 51 | |
| 7 | BK Häcken | 30 | 13 | 6 | 11 | 45 | 39 | +6 | 45 | Qualification for the Europa League second qualifying round (Note: BK Häcken qualified for the Europa League second qualifying round by winning the 2015–16 Svenska Cupen.) |
| 8 | Helsingborgs IF | 30 | 11 | 4 | 15 | 43 | 45 | −2 | 37 | |
| 9 | Örebro SK | 30 | 9 | 10 | 11 | 36 | 50 | −14 | 37 | |
| 10 | Gefle IF | 30 | 10 | 6 | 14 | 35 | 50 | −15 | 36 | |
| 11 | Hammarby IF | 30 | 8 | 9 | 13 | 35 | 39 | −4 | 33 | |
| 12 | GIF Sundsvall | 30 | 9 | 5 | 16 | 34 | 52 | −18 | 32 | |
| 13 | Kalmar FF | 30 | 8 | 7 | 15 | 31 | 42 | −11 | 31 | |
| 14 | Falkenbergs FF (O) | 30 | 7 | 4 | 19 | 38 | 56 | −18 | 25 | Qualification for the relegation play-offs |
| 15 | Halmstads BK (R) | 30 | 4 | 9 | 17 | 21 | 44 | −23 | 21 | Relegation to the Superettan |
| 16 | Åtvidabergs FF (R) | 30 | 2 | 9 | 19 | 25 | 55 | −30 | 15 | Relegation to the Superettan |

Source: svenskfotboll.se (in Swedish)
Rules for classification: 1) Points; 2) Goal difference; 3) Goals scored; 4) Head-to-head points; 5) Head-to-head goal difference; 6) Head-to-head away goals scored; 7) Play-off
(Note: Play-off is only played if need to decide champion, teams for relegation or UEFA competition and will be played on a neutral ground).
(C) Champions; (O) Play-off winners; (R) Relegated

== Positions by round ==
| Team ╲ Round | 1 | 2 | 3 | 4 | 5 | 6 | 7 | 8 | 9 | 10 | 11 | 12 | 13 | 14 | 15 | 16 | 17 | 18 | 19 | 20 | 21 | 22 | 23 | 24 | 25 | 26 | 27 | 28 | 29 | 30 |
|---|---|---|---|---|---|---|---|---|---|---|---|---|---|---|---|---|---|---|---|---|---|---|---|---|---|---|---|---|---|---|
| IFK Norrköping | 8 | 3 | 9 | 12 | 8 | 8 | 6 | 6 | 5 | 4 | 3 | 4 | 3 | 2 | 3 | 3 | 2 | 4 | 3 | 4 | 4 | 3 | 3 | 2 | 2 | 2 | 1 | 1 | 1 | 1 |
| IFK Göteborg | 6 | 2 | 6 | 3 | 1 | 3 | 3 | 1 | 1 | 1 | 1 | 1 | 1 | 1 | 1 | 1 | 1 | 1 | 1 | 1 | 1 | 1 | 1 | 1 | 1 | 1 | 2 | 3 | 2 | 2 |
| AIK | 4 | 7 | 3 | 5 | 4 | 4 | 4 | 5 | 6 | 6 | 6 | 6 | 6 | 6 | 5 | 6 | 6 | 5 | 5 | 3 | 3 | 2 | 2 | 3 | 3 | 3 | 3 | 2 | 3 | 3 |
| IF Elfsborg | 5 | 6 | 1 | 1 | 3 | 2 | 2 | 3 | 2 | 2 | 2 | 3 | 2 | 3 | 2 | 2 | 3 | 2 | 2 | 2 | 2 | 4 | 4 | 4 | 5 | 4 | 4 | 4 | 5 | 4 |
| Malmö FF | 1 | 4 | 2 | 2 | 2 | 1 | 1 | 2 | 4 | 5 | 4 | 2 | 4 | 5 | 6 | 5 | 5 | 6 | 6 | 5 | 5 | 5 | 5 | 5 | 4 | 5 | 5 | 5 | 4 | 5 |
| Djurgårdens IF | 11 | 10 | 13 | 9 | 7 | 7 | 5 | 4 | 3 | 3 | 5 | 5 | 5 | 4 | 4 | 4 | 4 | 3 | 4 | 6 | 6 | 6 | 6 | 6 | 6 | 6 | 6 | 6 | 6 | 6 |
| BK Häcken | 14 | 11 | 12 | 14 | 12 | 12 | 9 | 8 | 7 | 7 | 8 | 8 | 9 | 7 | 7 | 8 | 8 | 9 | 9 | 9 | 8 | 8 | 8 | 9 | 7 | 7 | 7 | 7 | 7 | 7 |
| Helsingborgs IF | 9 | 9 | 7 | 4 | 6 | 5 | 7 | 7 | 9 | 8 | 9 | 9 | 7 | 8 | 9 | 7 | 7 | 8 | 7 | 7 | 7 | 7 | 7 | 8 | 9 | 9 | 8 | 8 | 8 | 8 |
| Örebro SK | 7 | 12 | 14 | 16 | 16 | 16 | 16 | 16 | 14 | 14 | 14 | 14 | 14 | 14 | 15 | 15 | 15 | 15 | 15 | 15 | 15 | 14 | 13 | 13 | 13 | 11 | 11 | 11 | 9 | 9 |
| Gefle IF | 2 | 1 | 5 | 6 | 9 | 9 | 10 | 10 | 8 | 9 | 7 | 7 | 8 | 9 | 8 | 10 | 9 | 7 | 8 | 8 | 9 | 10 | 9 | 7 | 8 | 8 | 10 | 10 | 11 | 10 |
| Hammarby IF | 3 | 5 | 4 | 7 | 5 | 6 | 8 | 9 | 10 | 11 | 11 | 11 | 11 | 11 | 10 | 11 | 11 | 11 | 12 | 12 | 10 | 11 | 11 | 11 | 10 | 10 | 9 | 9 | 10 | 11 |
| GIF Sundsvall | 16 | 8 | 11 | 8 | 10 | 10 | 12 | 11 | 12 | 13 | 13 | 13 | 13 | 13 | 14 | 13 | 14 | 12 | 11 | 10 | 11 | 9 | 10 | 10 | 12 | 13 | 12 | 12 | 12 | 12 |
| Kalmar FF | 10 | 14 | 10 | 11 | 13 | 14 | 11 | 13 | 11 | 10 | 10 | 10 | 10 | 10 | 11 | 9 | 10 | 10 | 10 | 11 | 12 | 12 | 12 | 12 | 11 | 12 | 13 | 13 | 13 | 13 |
| Falkenbergs FF | 15 | 13 | 8 | 10 | 11 | 11 | 13 | 12 | 13 | 12 | 12 | 12 | 12 | 12 | 13 | 14 | 12 | 13 | 13 | 13 | 13 | 13 | 14 | 14 | 14 | 14 | 14 | 14 | 14 | 14 |
| Halmstads BK | 12 | 16 | 16 | 15 | 14 | 15 | 15 | 15 | 16 | 16 | 15 | 15 | 15 | 15 | 12 | 12 | 13 | 14 | 14 | 14 | 14 | 15 | 15 | 15 | 15 | 15 | 15 | 15 | 15 | 15 |
| Åtvidabergs FF | 13 | 15 | 15 | 13 | 15 | 13 | 14 | 15 | 15 | 15 | 16 | 16 | 16 | 16 | 16 | 16 | 16 | 16 | 16 | 16 | 16 | 16 | 16 | 16 | 16 | 16 | 16 | 16 | 16 | 16 |

| Leader |
| 2016–17 UEFA Europa League First qualifying round |
| Relegation play-offs |
| Relegation to 2016 Superettan |

Source: everysport.com

== Results ==
| Home \ Away | AIK | BKH | DIF | FFF | GIF | GIFS | HBK | HAM | HIF | IFE | IFKG | IFKN | KFF | MFF | ÅFF | ÖSK |
|---|---|---|---|---|---|---|---|---|---|---|---|---|---|---|---|---|
| AIK | | 2–1 | 1–0 | 4–3 | 3–1 | 4–1 | 2–1 | 2–0 | 3–1 | 4–2 | 1–2 | 2–2 | 2–1 | 2–1 | 1–0 | 3–0 |
| BK Häcken | 0–0 | | 1–1 | 0–2 | 1–1 | 3–1 | 4–1 | 3–3 | 3–2 | 5–2 | 1–2 | 0–2 | 3–0 | 1–0 | 3–0 | 2–0 |
| Djurgårdens IF | 2–2 | 2–1 | | 3–1 | 5–1 | 4–2 | 4–2 | 2–2 | 2–2 | 1–2 | 2–2 | 1–1 | 1–0 | 0–2 | 0–0 | 2–0 |
| Falkenbergs FF | 2–4 | 1–2 | 0–2 | | 0–2 | 1–1 | 1–0 | 0–1 | 2–3 | 2–2 | 1–0 | 0–1 | 1–3 | 3–3 | 6–0 | 2–0 |
| Gefle IF | 1–2 | 2–0 | 2–1 | 1–0 | | 3–1 | 0–0 | 1–1 | 2–1 | 2–3 | 0–0 | 1–2 | 2–0 | 1–2 | 2–1 | 2–2 |
| GIF Sundsvall | 0–2 | 1–1 | 0–2 | 0–1 | 2–1 | | 0–0 | 3–0 | 2–1 | 0–1 | 2–2 | 0–1 | 1–1 | 1–4 | 0–1 | 1–0 |
| Halmstads BK | 0–1 | 0–2 | 2–3 | 0–1 | 0–1 | 1–0 | | 2–1 | 1–2 | 1–0 | 1–2 | 0–3 | 1–0 | 0–0 | 0–0 | 2–2 |
| Hammarby IF | 1–0 | 2–0 | 2–1 | 3–0 | 3–0 | 1–2 | 2–2 | | 1–4 | 0–0 | 0–1 | 0–1 | 0–0 | 0–1 | 2–1 | 1–2 |
| Helsingborgs IF | 3–1 | 1–2 | 0–1 | 0–0 | 1–2 | 2–0 | 2–0 | 1–0 | | 2–1 | 1–2 | 3–1 | 1–2 | 0–3 | 3–0 | 0–2 |
| IF Elfsborg | 3–2 | 1–0 | 2–0 | 4–2 | 5–1 | 1–2 | 2–0 | 1–1 | 2–1 | | 1–1 | 3–2 | 2–1 | 2–2 | 3–1 | 2–2 |
| IFK Göteborg | 3–0 | 4–0 | 0–0 | 2–1 | 3–0 | 3–2 | 1–1 | 1–0 | 3–1 | 1–0 | | 0–0 | 2–2 | 0–1 | 1–0 | 6–0 |
| IFK Norrköping | 1–2 | 3–1 | 4–2 | 2–0 | 4–1 | 5–1 | 3–1 | 1–0 | 3–2 | 0–4 | 2–2 | | 2–1 | 3–1 | 2–1 | 1–1 |
| Kalmar FF | 0–0 | 0–1 | 0–3 | 4–0 | 3–1 | 0–2 | 1–0 | 2–2 | 0–0 | 0–3 | 0–2 | 1–2 | | 2–1 | 2–1 | 3–0 |
| Malmö FF | 0–0 | 0–3 | 1–1 | 4–3 | 2–0 | 3–0 | 3–1 | 3–1 | 3–1 | 1–1 | 2–1 | 0–2 | 3–0 | | 3–0 | 2–2 |
| Åtvidabergs FF | 1–1 | 1–1 | 2–3 | 3–1 | 1–1 | 2–3 | 0–0 | 0–3 | 1–2 | 1–2 | 0–1 | 1–1 | 1–1 | 2–2 | | 2–3 |
| Örebro SK | 1–1 | 2–0 | 0–1 | 2–1 | 1–0 | 1–3 | 1–1 | 2–2 | 0–0 | 4–2 | 0–2 | 1–3 | 2–1 | 1–1 | 2–1 | |

Source: Swedish Football Association (in Swedish)
Legend: Blue = home team win; Yellow = draw; Red = away team win.

== Play-offs ==
The 14th-placed team of Allsvenskan meets the third-placed team from 2015 Superettan in a Two-legged tie on a home-and-away basis with the team from Allsvenskan finishing at home.

5 November 2015
18:00

| IK Sirius | 2–2 | Falkenbergs FF |
|---|---|---|
| Ogbu 11', 64' | Report | Nilsson 19', 56' |

Studenternas IP, Uppsala
Attendance: 7,100
Referee: Andreas Ekberg (Lund)

8 November 2015
17:15

| Falkenbergs FF | 1–1 | IK Sirius |
|---|---|---|
| Keat 56' | Report | Eriksson 19' |

Falkenbergs IP, Falkenberg
Attendance: 3,594
Referee: Mohammed Al-Hakim (Köping)

3–3 on aggregate. Falkenbergs FF won on away goals.

== Season statistics ==
=== Top scorers ===
| Rank | Player | Club | Goals |
|---|---|---|---|
| 1 | (Sweden) Emir Kujović | IFK Norrköping | 21 |
| 2 | (Eritrea) Henok Goitom | AIK | 18 |
| 3 | (Sweden) Marcus Antonsson | Kalmar FF | 12 |
| 3 | (Zimbabwe) Nyasha Mushekwi | Djurgårdens IF | 12 |
| 3 | (Sweden) Johan Oremo | Gefle IF | 12 |
| 3 | (Sweden) Robin Simović | Helsingborgs IF | 12 |
| 7 | (Sweden) Viktor Claesson | IF Elfsborg | 11 |
| 7 | (Brazil) Paulinho | BK Häcken | 11 |
| 7 | (Sweden) Markus Rosenberg | Malmö FF | 11 |

=== Top assists ===
| Rank | Player | Club | Assists |
|---|---|---|---|
| 1 | (Sweden) Viktor Claesson | IF Elfsborg | 10 |
| 1 | (Iceland) Arnór Ingvi Traustason | IFK Norrköping | 10 |
| 3 | (Sweden) Astrit Ajdarević | Örebro SK | 9 |
| 3 | (Norway) Magnus Wolff Eikrem | Malmö FF | 9 |
| 5 | (Sweden) Kristian Bergström | Åtvidabergs FF | 8 |
| 6 | (The Gambia) Pa Dibba | GIF Sundsvall | 6 |
| 6 | (Serbia) Nikola Đurđić | Malmö FF | 6 |
| 6 | (Sweden) Jonas Lantto | Gefle IF | 6 |
| 6 | (Sweden) Kerim Mrabti | Djurgårdens IF | 6 |
| 6 | (Bosnia and Herzegovina) Haris Radetinac | Djurgårdens IF | 6 |
| 6 | (Norway) Fredrik Torsteinbø | Hammarby IF | 6 |
| 6 | (Sweden) Calle Wede | Falkenbergs FF | 6 |

=== Top goalkeepers ===
(Minimum of 10 games played)

| Rank | Goalkeeper | Club | GP | GA | SV% | CS |
|---|---|---|---|---|---|---|
| 1 | (Sweden) John Alvbåge | IFK Göteborg | 30 | 22 | 81 | 14 |
| 2 | (North Macedonia) David Mitov Nilsson | IFK Norrköping | 30 | 33 | 76 | 9 |
| 2 | (Sweden) Patrik Carlgren | AIK | 25 | 26 | 76 | 8 |
| 2 | (Sweden) Gustav Jansson | Åtvidabergs FF | 11 | 21 | 76 | 2 |
| 5 | (Sweden) Stojan Lukić | Halmstads BK | 29 | 43 | 75 | 8 |
| 5 | (Sweden) Otto Martler | Falkenbergs FF | 30 | 56 | 75 | 8 |
| 5 | (Sweden) Johan Wiland | Malmö FF | 14 | 12 | 75 | 7 |
| 5 | (Sweden) Christoffer Källqvist | BK Häcken | 13 | 15 | 75 | 5 |
| 5 | (Sweden) Jacob Rinne | Örebro SK | 14 | 20 | 75 | 2 |
| 10 | (Sweden) Pär Hansson | Helsingborgs IF | 23 | 34 | 74 | 6 |

=== Hat-tricks ===
| Player | For | Against | Result | Date |
|---|---|---|---|---|
| (Denmark) Søren Rieks | IFK Göteborg | BK Häcken | 4–0 | 16 August 2015 |
| (Brazil) Paulinho | BK Häcken | Halmstads BK | 4–1 | 14 September 2015 |
| (Sweden) Martin Broberg | Örebro SK | IF Elfsborg | 4–2 | 21 September 2015 |
| (Brazil) Paulinho | BK Häcken | IF Elfsborg | 5–2 | 25 October 2015 |
| (Sweden) Sebastian Andersson | Djurgårdens IF | GIF Sundsvall | 4–2 | 31 October 2015 |

=== Scoring ===
- First goal of the season: Kennedy Bakircioglu for Hammarby IF against BK Häcken (4 April 2015)
- Largest winning margin: 6 goals
  - IFK Göteborg 6–0 Örebro SK (2 August 2015)
  - Falkenbergs FF 6–0 Åtvidabergs FF (18 October 2015)
- Highest scoring game: 7 goals
  - AIK 4–3 Falkenbergs FF (3 June 2015)
  - Malmö FF 4–3 Falkenbergs FF (23 September 2015)
  - BK Häcken 5–2 IF Elfsborg (25 October 2015)
- Most goals scored in a match by a single team: 6 goals
  - IFK Göteborg 6–0 Örebro SK (2 August 2015)
  - Falkenbergs FF 6–0 Åtvidabergs FF (18 October 2015)
- Most goals scored in a match by a losing team: 3 goals
  - AIK 4–3 Falkenbergs FF (3 June 2015)
  - Malmö FF 4–3 Falkenbergs FF (23 September 2015)
- Fewest games failed to score in: 2
  - IFK Norrköping
- Most games failed to score in: 14
  - Halmstads BK

=== Clean sheets ===
- Most clean sheets: 14
  - IFK Göteborg
- Fewest clean sheets: 4
  - GIF Sundsvall
  - Åtvidabergs FF
  - Örebro SK

=== Discipline ===
- Most yellow cards (club): 62
  - Malmö FF
- Most yellow cards (player): 9
  - Marcus Rohdén (IF Elfsborg)
  - Daniel Sjölund (IFK Norrköping)
- Most red cards (club): 5
  - Åtvidabergs FF
- Most red cards (player): 2
  - Daniel Hallingström (Åtvidabergs FF)
- Most fouls (player): 71
  - Robin Simović (Helsingborgs IF)

== See also ==
Competitions

- 2015 Superettan
- 2015 Division 1
- 2014–15 Svenska Cupen
- 2015–16 Svenska Cupen

Team seasons

- 2015 AIK Fotboll season
- 2015 BK Häcken season
- 2015 Djurgårdens IF season
- 2015 Hammarby Fotboll season
- 2015 IFK Göteborg season
- 2015 IFK Norrköping season
- 2015 Malmö FF season

== Attendances ==
| # | Club | Average | Highest |
|---|---|---|---|
| 1 | Hammarby IF | 25,507 | 30,869 |
| 2 | AIK | 20,983 | 43,713 |
| 3 | Malmö FF | 17,332 | 22,337 |
| 4 | Djurgårdens IF | 15,484 | 27,428 |
| 5 | IFK Göteborg | 14,350 | 17,340 |
| 6 | IFK Norrköping | 10,296 | 16,125 |
| 7 | IF Elfsborg | 9,239 | 16,177 |
| 8 | Helsingborgs IF | 8,138 | 12,678 |
| 9 | Örebro SK | 6,980 | 10,770 |
| 10 | Kalmar FF | 6,163 | 10,436 |
| 11 | GIF Sundsvall | 5,049 | 7,850 |
| 12 | Halmstads BK | 4,675 | 6,641 |
| 13 | Gefle IF | 4,258 | 6,430 |
| 14 | Åtvidabergs FF | 3,801 | 7,112 |
| 15 | BK Häcken | 3,565 | 9,237 |
| 16 | Falkenbergs FF | 3,557 | 5,470 |
