= Sauli Väisänen =

Finnish footballer (born 1994)

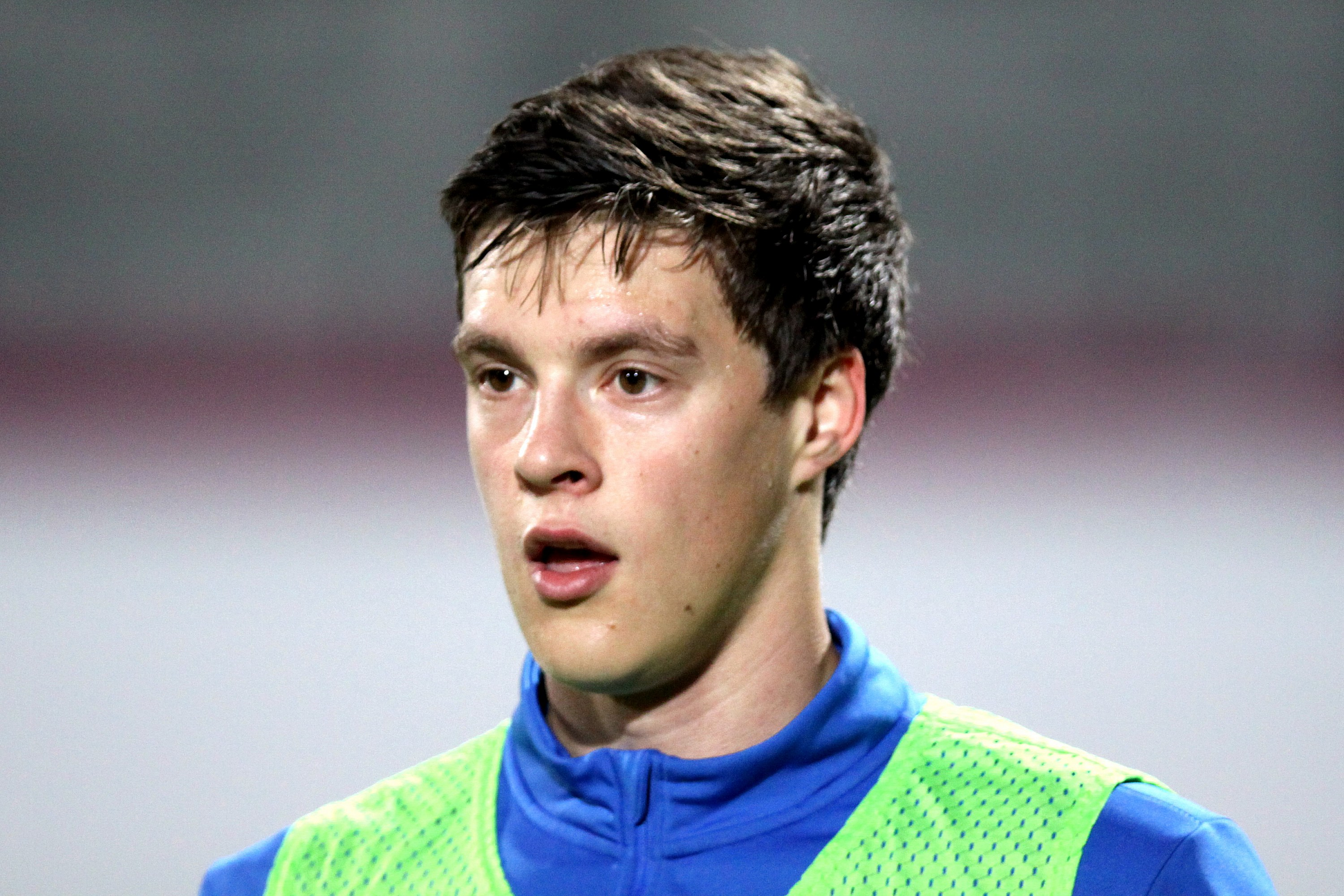
- Väisänen with Finland U21 in 2015

Personal information
- Full name: Sauli Aapo Kasperi Väisänen
- Date of birth: 5 June 1994 (age 32)
- Place of birth: Helsinki, Finland
- Height: 1.90 m (6 ft 3 in)
- Position: Centre-back

Team information
- Current team: Ilves
- Number: 5

Youth career
- –2003: Jokerit
- 2004–2006: Allianssi
- 2007: PK-35
- 2008–2009: HJK
- 2010–2013: Honka

Senior career*
Years	Team	Apps	(Gls)
2012–2013	Pallohonka	35	(5)
2013–2014	Honka	17	(2)
2014–2017	AIK	46	(2)
2015	→ HIFK (loan)	6	(1)
2017–2019	SPAL	7	(0)
2018–2019	→ Crotone (loan)	26	(0)
2019–2021	Chievo	21	(1)
2021–2023	Cosenza	50	(1)
2023–2024	OB	2	(0)
2024	→ Ascoli (loan)	14	(0)
2025–	Ilves	42	(0)

International career^{‡}
2014	Finland U20	2	(1)
2014–2016	Finland U21	14	(1)
2016–	Finland	25	(0)
Medal record
Men's football
Honka
Second place	Veikkausliiga	2013
AIK
Third place	Allsvenskan	2014
Third place	Allsvenskan	2015
Second place	Allsvenskan	2016
Second place	Allsvenskan	2017
- * Club domestic league appearances and goals as of 13 November 2026 ‡ National team caps and goals as of 20 November 2022

Sauli Väisänen (born 5 June 1994) is a Finnish professional footballer who plays as a centre-back for Veikkausliiga club Ilves. He began his senior club career playing for Honka, before signing with AIK at age 20 in 2014.

Väisänen made his international debut for Finland in October 2016, at the age of 22. He appeared in 5 out of 10 of Finland's UEFA Euro 2020 qualification matches and helped Finland national team for the first time to reach the European Football Championship tournament's group stage.

== Club career ==
=== Honka ===
Väisänen made his first team debut during season 2013, in a match against KuPS. He was known as a crucial part of the Honka reserve team Pallohonka.

=== AIK ===
In summer 2014 Väisänen joined AIK. He spent 4 seasons in the club. During season 2015 he was loaned to HIFK.

=== SPAL and loan to Crotone ===
Väisänen made his Seria A debut on 20 August 2017 in a match against Lazio. He was loaned to Crotone for season 2018–19.

=== Chievo ===
On 24 August 2019, Väisänen signed a deal with Serie B club Chievo. He made his debut in Chievo in a 1–1 home tie with Empoli on 30 August 2019.

=== Cosenza ===
On 16 August 2021, he joined Cosenza. He made his debut on 22 August 2021 playing full 90 minutes in a match against Ascoli.

=== Odense Boldklub ===
On 20 June 2023, Väisänen joined Danish Superliga club OB, signing a deal until June 2026.

==== Ascoli (loan) ====
On 18 January 2024, Väisänen returned to Italy when he was loaned out to Serie B side Ascoli.

On August 29, 2024, after his loan spell in Ascoli, OB confirmed that they had terminated Väisänen's contract by mutual agreement, despite the fact that he originally had a contract until June 2026.

=== Ilves ===
In late December 2024, Väisänen returned to Finland and signed a two-year deal with Veikkausliiga club Ilves.

== International career ==
=== Finland youth teams ===
Väisänen made his debut in international football on 5 March 2014 at the age of 19 when he was called to represent Finland U21 in a match against San Marino U21. During the years 2014-2016 Väisänen was a part of the Finnish national youth squad, which he also captained on occasion.

=== Finland first team ===
Väisänen made his FIFA World Cup qualification match debut on 6 October 2016 on Laugardalsvöllur when Hans Backe chose him to the starting eleven for a match against Iceland.

Väisänen was called up for the UEFA Euro 2020 pre-tournament friendly match against Sweden on 29 May 2021. He was nominated to the Finland national team for the UEFA Euro 2020 tournament but had to withdraw due to an injury and was replaced by Niko Hämäläinen.

== Personal life ==
Väisänen's mother Anna-Liisa Tilus-Väisänen is a prominent television presenter for Yle TV1 and Miss World 1984 semi-finalist. His younger brother Leo Väisänen is also a footballer.

== Career statistics ==
=== Club ===
As of 11 March 2025

Appearances and goals by club, season and competition
Club	Season	League			Cup (Note: Includes Suomen Cup, Svenska Cupen, Coppa Italia and Danish Cup)		League cup		Europe		Total	
Club	Season	Division	Apps	Goals	Apps	Goals	Apps	Goals	Apps	Goals	Apps	Goals
Pallohonka	2012	Kakkonen	15	1	0	0	—		—		15	1
Pallohonka	2013	Kakkonen	20	4	0	0	—		—		20	4
Pallohonka	Total		35	5	0	0	—		—		35	5
Honka	2013	Veikkausliiga	2	1	0	0	2	0	0	0	4	1
Honka	2014	Veikkausliiga	15	1	1	1	5	1	2 (Note: Appearance(s) in UEFA Europa League)	0	23	3
Honka	Total		17	2	1	1	7	1	2	0	27	4
AIK	2014	Allsvenskan	6	0	0	0	—		0	0	6	0
AIK	2015	Allsvenskan	6	1	3	1	—		0	0	9	2
AIK	2016	Allsvenskan	22	1	5	1	—		2	0	29	2
AIK	2017	Allsvenskan	12	0	0	0	—		4	0	16	0
AIK	Total		46	2	8	2	0	0	6	0	60	4
HIFK (loan)	2015	Veikkausliiga	6	1	0	0	0	0	—		6	1
S.P.A.L.	2017–18	Serie A	7	0	2	0	—		—		9	0
S.P.A.L.	2018–19	Serie A	0	0	1	0	—		—		1	0
S.P.A.L.	Total		7	0	3	0	—		—		10	0
Crotone (loan)	2018–19	Serie B	26	0	0	0	—		—		26	0
Chievo	2019–20	Serie B	16	1	0	0	—		—		16	1
Chievo	2020–21	Serie B	5	0	0	0	—		—		5	0
Chievo	Total		21	1	0	0	—		—		21	1
Cosenza	2021–22	Serie B	21	0	0	0	—		—		21	0
Cosenza	2022–23	Serie B	29	1	1	0	—		—		30	1
Cosenza	Total		50	1	1	0	—		—		51	1
OB	2023–24	Danish Superliga	2	0	3	0	—		–		5	0
Ascoli (loan)	2023–24	Serie B	14	0	0	0	—		—		14	0
Ilves	2025	Veikkausliiga	0	0	0	0	4	0	0	0	4	0
Career total			223	12	16	3	11	1	8	0	258	16

=== International ===
As of match played 20 November 2022

National team	Year	Competitive		Friendly		Total	
National team	Year	Apps	Goals	Apps	Goals	Apps	Goals
Finland	2016	3 (Note: Appearances in the 2018 FIFA World Cup qualification.)	0	0	0	3	0
Finland	2017	3 (Note: Appearances in the 2018 FIFA World Cup qualification.)	0	3	0	6	0
Finland	2018	2 (Note: Appearances in the 2018–19 UEFA Nations League.)	0	3	0	5	0
Finland	2019	5 (Note: Appearances in the UEFA Euro 2020 qualifying.)	0	0	0	5	0
Finland	2020	0	0	0	0	0	0
Finland	2021	0	0	1	0	1	0
Finland	2022	2 (Note: Appearances in the 2022–23 UEFA Nations League.)	0	2	0	4	0
Total		15	0	9	0	24	0
