= Christoffer Wiktorsson =

Swedish footballer

Personal information
- Date of birth: 22 March 1989 (age 37)
- Place of birth: Sweden
- Height: 1.82 m (5 ft 11 1/2 in)
- Position: Defender

Youth career
- Degerfors IF

Senior career*
Years	Team	Apps	(Gls)
2007–2011	Degerfors IF	98	(6)
2012–2015	Örebro SK	59	(0)
2016–2021	Degerfors IF	124	(3)

International career
2008	Sweden U19	2	(0)
- * Club domestic league appearances and goals as of 16 October 2021

Christoffer Wiktorsson (born 22 March 1989) is a Swedish footballer who plays as a defender.
