= Marcus Pode =

Swedish footballer

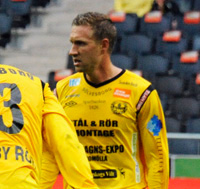

Personal information
- Date of birth: 27 March 1986 (age 40)
- Place of birth: Malmö, Sweden
- Height: 1.86 m (6 ft 1 in)
- Position: Forward

Team information
- Current team: IFK Klagshamn
- Number: 20

Youth career
- 1992–2005: Malmö FF

Senior career*
Years	Team	Apps	(Gls)
2005–2007	Malmö FF	42	(8)
2007–2009	FC Nordsjælland	15	(1)
2009–2011	Trelleborgs FF	63	(13)
2012–2013	Mjällby AIF	28	(2)
2013	→ Örebro SK (loan)	13	(1)
2014–2015	Örebro SK	50	(11)
2016–2018	Trelleborgs FF	72	(22)
2019–	IFK Klagshamn		

International career
2005	Sweden U19	5	(1)
2005–2007	Sweden U21	10	(0)
- * Club domestic league appearances and goals as of 22 January 2019

Marcus Pode (born 27 March 1986) is a Swedish professional football who plays for IFK Klagshamn as a forward. He started playing football in Malmö FF and has also played for FC Nordsjælland and Örebro SK. He has been capped for the Swedish under 21 national team.

== Career ==
Pode left Trelleborgs FF at the end of 2018, together with four other teammates. On 1 March 2019, he then joined IFK Klagshamn where his brother, Daniel Pode, where the manager.
