= Måns Ekvall =

Swedish footballer

Personal information
- Date of birth: 4 January 1995 (age 31)
- Place of birth: Landskrona, Sweden
- Height: 1.80 m (5 ft 11 in)
- Position: Midfielder

Team information
- Current team: Vasalund
- Number: 8

Youth career
- 2001–2009: IK Wormo
- 2009–2012: Helsingborgs IF

Senior career*
Years	Team	Apps	(Gls)
2013–2014	Helsingborg	2	(0)
2013	→ HIF Akademi (loan)	18	(2)
2014	→ Örgryte (loan)	5	(0)
2015–2021	Landskrona	166	(5)
2022–	Vasalund	2	(0)

International career^{‡}
2014	Sweden U19	4	(0)
- * Club domestic league appearances and goals as of 9 April 2022 ‡ National team caps and goals as of 29 May 2014

Måns Ekvall (born 4 January 1995) is a Swedish footballer who plays for Vasalund.

== Club career ==
Ekvall started playing football at IK Wormo as a six-year-old. In 2009 he joined Helsingborgs IF. In 2013 Ekvall was loaned out to HIF's father club HIF Akademi, where he was named "Helsingborgs IF Academy Player of the Year" after the season. For the 2014 season, he was moved up to HIF's A squad and was loaned to Örgryte IS.

In December 2014 Ekvall signed for Landskrona BoIS. In December 2019, Ekvall extended his contract by one year and in December 2020 he extended his contract by another year. After the 2021 season Ekvall left the club.

On 28 December 2021, Ekvall joined Vasalund for the 2022 season.
