= Alex Pereira (footballer) =

Brazilian footballer (born 1982)

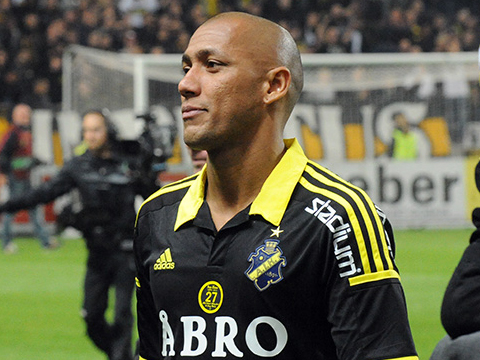

Personal information
- Full name: Alessandro Silva Pereira
- Date of birth: 15 May 1982 (age 44)
- Place of birth: Brazil
- Height: 1.81 m (5 ft 11 1/2 in)
- Position: Defender

Youth career
- Paysandu

Senior career*
Years	Team	Apps	(Gls)
2007	Ananindeua		
2008	Assyriska FF	26	(3)
2009–2010	Örgryte IS	35	(4)
2011–2014	Syrianska FC	49	(0)
2014–2015	AFC United	21	(2)
2015	→ AIK Fotboll (loan)	14	(2)
2016–2017	Assyriska FF	15	(0)
- * Club domestic league appearances and goals as of 30 November 2017

Alessandro "Alex" Silva Pereira (born 15 May 1982) is a Brazilian former footballer who played as a defender.
