= Östgötaderbyt =

Association football rivalry

- Location: Östergötland, Sweden
- Teams: IFK Norrköping; Åtvidabergs FF
- Latest meeting: 22 September 2014; Åtvidabergs FF 2–2 IFK Norrköping
- Next meeting: 3 May 2015; IFK Norrköping–Åtvidabergs FF

Statistics
- Total meetings: 57
- Most wins: IFK Norrköping (32)
- Largest victory: 1932–33; Åtvidabergs FF–IFK Norrköping (0–4)

Locations of the two clubs in Östergötland.

Östgötaderbyt (lit. The Östergötland Derby) is the fixture between the two association football clubs IFK Norrköping and Åtvidabergs FF, it is a local derby in Östergötland, Sweden and a fierce rivalry. The derby is commonly known as Östgötaderbyt, although this is a generic term that could be used for any fixture between two clubs in Östergötland. The rivalry has arisen because the two clubs are the most successful clubs in Östergötland. The two clubs have also played most seasons in the top tier league Allsvenskan of all Östergötland clubs and they are also the two out of just three Östergötland clubs to have won the Swedish football championship, IFK Norrköping with 13 titles and Åtvidabergs FF with 2 titles. The majority of the matches between the two clubs have taken place in Allsvenskan, but fixtures have also taken place in Division 2 and Superettan. As of the 2024 season, IFK Norrköping are competing in Allsvenskan, and Åtvidabergs FF are in Division 2 (4th tier).

== Matches ==
As of 22 September 2014

	Matches	Wins		Draws	Goals		Home wins		Home draws		Away wins	
	Matches	Åtvidaberg	Norrköping	Draws	Åtvidaberg	Norrköping	Åtvidaberg	Norrköping	Åtvidaberg	Norrköping	Åtvidaberg	Norrköping
Allsvenskan	36	10	18	8								
Superettan	12	1	7	4								
Division 2	6	0	6	0								
Svenska Cupen	3	2	1	0								
Total	57	13	32	14								

=== Åtvidaberg in the league at home ===
Date	Venue	Score	Competition	Attendance
1932–33		0–4	Division 2	
1933–34		1–2	Division 2	
1934–35		2–5	Division 2	
1951–52		1–3	Allsvenskan	
1968		3–1	Allsvenskan	
1969		3–2	Allsvenskan	
1970		0–2	Allsvenskan	
1971		1–1	Allsvenskan	
1972		4–1	Allsvenskan	
1973		2–1	Allsvenskan	
1974		1–1	Allsvenskan	
1975		2–4	Allsvenskan	
1976		1–2	Allsvenskan	
1978		1–3	Allsvenskan	
1979		1–0	Allsvenskan	
1980		1–0	Allsvenskan	
1981		1–2	Allsvenskan	
1982		0–2	Allsvenskan	
2003		2–2	Superettan	
2004		1–2	Superettan	
2005		2–2	Superettan	
2006		1–2	Superettan	
2007		0–1	Superettan	
2009		0–2	Superettan	
27 August 2012	Kopparvallen	1–1	Allsvenskan	
30 September 2013	Kopparvallen	1–3	Allsvenskan	
22 September 2014	Kopparvallen	2–2	Allsvenskan	

=== Norrköping in the league at home ===
Date	Venue	Score	Competition	Attendance
1932–33		4–3	Division 2	
1933–34		5–2	Division 2	
1934–35		3–0	Division 2	
1951–52		3–0	Allsvenskan	
1968		1–0	Allsvenskan	
1969		4–2	Allsvenskan	
1970		1–1	Allsvenskan	
1971		0–3	Allsvenskan	
1972		1–2	Allsvenskan	
1973		1–1	Allsvenskan	
1974		4–2	Allsvenskan	
1975		1–1	Allsvenskan	
1976		1–0	Allsvenskan	
1978		2–3	Allsvenskan	
1979		2–1	Allsvenskan	
1980		1–4	Allsvenskan	
1981		1–0	Allsvenskan	
1982		2–0	Allsvenskan	
2003		1–1	Superettan	
2004		0–2	Superettan	
2005		2–1	Superettan	
2006		4–1	Superettan	
2007		1–0	Superettan	
2009		2–2	Superettan	
2012	Idrottsparken	2–2	Allsvenskan	
19 May 2013	Idrottsparken	2–1	Allsvenskan	
7 May 2014	Idrottsparken	2–1	Allsvenskan	

== Honours ==
Team	Allsvenskan	Svenska Cupen	Total
IFK Norrköping	12	6	18
Åtvidabergs FF	2	2	4
