= Dennis Olsson =

Swedish footballer

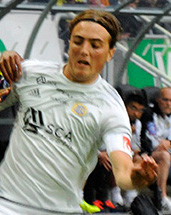

Personal information
- Full name: Dennis Oscar Olsson
- Date of birth: 3 October 1994 (age 32)
- Place of birth: Sundsvall, Sweden
- Height: 1.81 m (5 ft 11 in)
- Position: Left back

Youth career
- 2002–2012: GIF Sundsvall

Senior career*
Years	Team	Apps	(Gls)
2012–2018	GIF Sundsvall	121	(1)
2019	Torpedo-BelAZ Zhodino	7	(0)
2019–2025	GIF Sundsvall	130	(4)
Total		258	(5)

International career
2011	Sweden U17	2	(0)
2013	Sweden U19	5	(1)
- * Club domestic league appearances and goals

Dennis Olsson (born 3 October 1994) is a Swedish former footballer who played as a left back.

== Career ==
On 25 March 2019, Olsson joined Belarusian Premier League side Torpedo-BelAZ Zhodino after his contract had expired at GIF Sundsvall.

He retired at the end of 2025.
