= Sam Lundholm =

Swedish footballer

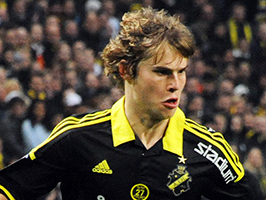
- Lundholm playing for AIK in 2015

Personal information
- Full name: Sam Johan Hampus Lundholm
- Date of birth: 1 July 1994 (age 32)
- Place of birth: Stockholm, Sweden
- Height: 1.82 m (6 ft 0 in)
- Position: Winger

Youth career
- Viggbyholms IK
- –2012: IFK Vaxholm

Senior career*
Years	Team	Apps	(Gls)
2012–2015	AIK	34	(1)
2015–2017	NEC	13	(0)
2017	→ Randers (loan)	1	(0)
2017–2021	IK Sirius	59	(9)

International career^{‡}
2013	Sweden U19	7	(1)
2015	Sweden U21	3	(3)
- * Club domestic league appearances and goals as of 2 November 2019 ‡ National team caps and goals as of 27 February 2017

Sam Lundholm (born 1 July 1994), is a Swedish football player who plays as a winger.
