= Eiður Sigurbjörnsson =

Icelandic footballer

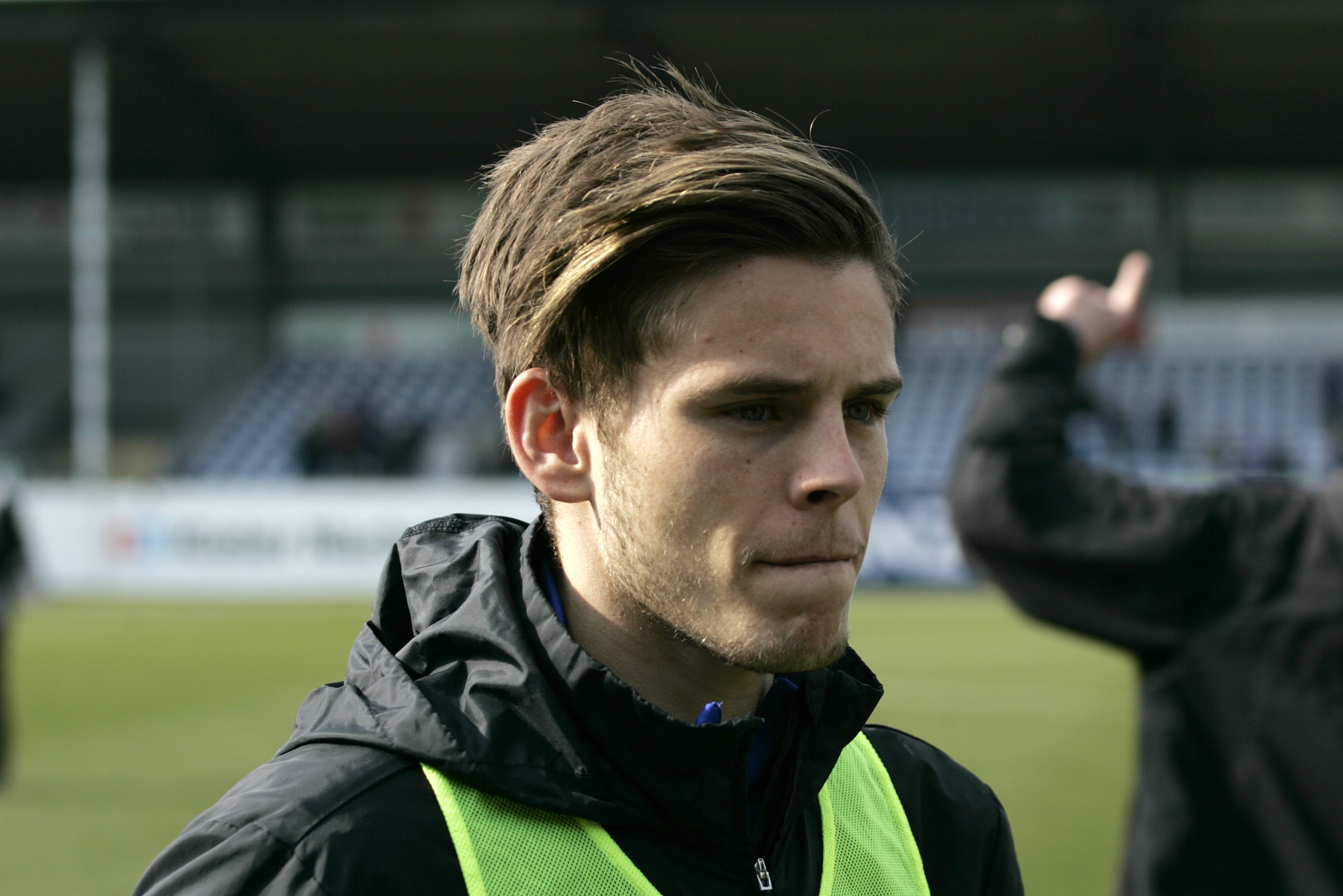

Personal information
- Full name: Eiður Aron Sigurbjörnsson
- Date of birth: 26 February 1990 (age 36)
- Place of birth: Iceland
- Position: Defender

Team information
- Current team: Njarðvík
- Number: 23

Senior career*
| Years | Team | Apps | (Gls) |
| 2009–2011 | ÍBV | 54 | (3) |
| 2011–2015 | Örebro SK | 35 | (1) |
| 2013–2014 | → ÍBV (loan) | 34 | (2) |
| 2014 | → Sandnes Ulf (loan) | 8 | (1) |
| 2016–2017 | Holstein Kiel | 19 | (0) |
| 2017–2020 | Valur | 77 | (3) |
| 2020–2024 | ÍBV | 92 | (12) |
| 2024–2025 | Vestri | 45 | (0) |
| 2026– | Njarðvík | 21 | (1) |

International career^{‡}
| 2011 | Iceland futsal | 3 | (0) |
| 2011–2012 | Iceland U-21 | 7 | (0) |
| 2019– | Iceland | 1 | (0) |
- * Club domestic league appearances and goals as of 14 October 2026 ‡ National team caps and goals as of 30 January 2019

Eiður Aron Sigurbjörnsson (born 26 February 1990) is an Icelandic footballer who plays as a defender for Njarðvík. In May 2017 he signed a 2.5 year contract for Valur.

== Career ==
In November 2015, Eiður signed for German 3. Liga side Holstein Kiel until summer 2017. In May 2017, the club announced that Eiður will return to Iceland and transfer to the team Valur.

On 22 August 2025, he won the Icelandic Cup with Vestri.

== International ==
He made his debut for the Iceland national football team on 11 January 2019 in a friendly against Sweden, as a starter.
