= Daniel Björnquist =

Swedish footballer

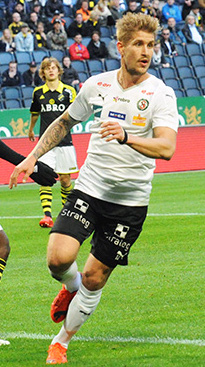

Personal information
- Full name: Daniel Lars; Tommy Björnquist
- Date of birth: 8 January 1989 (age 37)
- Place of birth: Sweden
- Height: 1.78 m (5 ft 10 in)
- Position: Defender

Youth career
- –2007: Sköllersta IF

Senior career*
Years	Team	Apps	(Gls)
2008	Sköllersta IF	21	(6)
2009–2011	Örebro SK Ungdom	62	(2)
2012–2013	BK Forward	33	(0)
2012	→ BK Forward 2	1	(0)
2013–2016	Örebro SK	95	(1)
2017	AFC Eskilstuna	30	(0)
2018–2023	Örebro SK	121	(1)
- * Club domestic league appearances and goals as of 18 November 2023

Daniel Björnquist (born 8 January 1989), sometimes spelled Daniel Björnkvist or Daniel Björnqvist, is a Swedish footballer who plays as a defender.
