= Henok Goitom =

Association football player (born 1984)

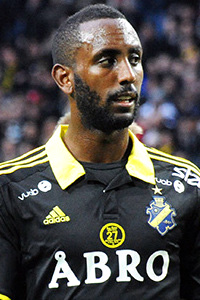
- Goitom with AIK in 2014

Personal information
- Date of birth: 22 September 1984 (age 42)
- Place of birth: Solna, Sweden
- Height: 1.89 m (6 ft 2 in)
- Position: Centre-forward

Team information
- Current team: Degerfors (manager)

Youth career
- 1998–2000: Essinge IK
- 2001–2002: Inter Orhoy
- 2002–2003: Vasalunds IF

Senior career*
Years	Team	Apps	(Gls)
2003–2007	Udinese	1	(1)
2005–2007	→ Ciudad Murcia (loan)	75	(23)
2007–2009	Murcia	31	(2)
2008–2009	→ Valladolid (loan)	29	(10)
2009–2012	Almería	78	(8)
2012–2015	AIK	93	(39)
2016	Getafe	2	(0)
2016	San Jose Earthquakes	8	(0)
2017–2021	AIK	142	(39)
Total		459	(122)

International career
2003	Sweden U19	3	(1)
2005–2006	Sweden U21	13	(4)
2015–2019	Eritrea	4	(1)

Managerial career
- 2021–2022: AIK (under-19)
- 2022: AIK (interim)
- 2023–2024: AIK (assistant)
- 2024: AIK (interim)
- 2025–: Degerfors
- * Club domestic league appearances and goals

Henok Goitom (Swedish pronunciation: [ˈhěːnɔk]; born 22 September 1984) is a former professional footballer who played as a centre-forward. He is the current manager of Allsvenskan club Degerfors IF.

He spent most of his 18-year career with AIK (two spells) and in Spain, where he played 215 matches and scored 42 goals across both major levels – 109 games and 14 goals in La Liga. He also competed professionally in Italy and the United States.

Born in Sweden, Goitom represented Eritrea as a senior after having appeared for Sweden at youth level. He made his debut for the former in 2015, earning four caps in four years and scoring once.

== Early life ==
Goitom was born in Solna, Stockholm, and raised in the nearby Husby district. His parents were born in Eritrea.

== Club career ==
=== Udinese ===
Goitom moved to Italy in 2004 to join Udinese Calcio, rarely being an option during his short stay. However, in his sole Serie A appearance, on 19 February 2005, he only needed seven minutes as a late substitute to score the 90th-minute 1–1 equaliser against Inter Milan.

Subsequently, Goitom served a two-year loan in the Spanish Segunda División with Ciudad de Murcia. He netted 15 league goals in his second season.

=== Murcia ===
Goitom was released by Udinese in 2007, and signed a four-year deal with neighbouring Real Murcia CF for a reported €3 million; the president of UD Almería, Alfonso García, however, announced the club would take matters to court: as he appeared before the media during the presentation of Aitor López Rekarte, showed journalists papers which proved an agreement had already been reached between Almería and Udinese. He only scored twice during the entire campaign, which saw the side relegated from La Liga as last.

In July 2008, Goitom was loaned for one season to fellow top-tier Real Valladolid, which had an option to buy at the campaign's closure. Established as first choice, he netted twice in a 3–2 away win over Recreativo de Huelva on 8 March 2009, but was also sent off during the match (as teammate Álvaro Rubio). He finished as team top scorer, at ten.

=== Almería ===
In late July 2009, Goitom was released by Murcia and joined Almería in the same league, replacing Sevilla FC-bound Álvaro Negredo. His season output consisted of one goal, in a 1–1 home draw against CD Tenerife. Also, even though he was the only pure striker in the squad, he was never an undisputed starter, but the Andalusians retained their top-division status in the end.

Goitom scored one of Almería's most important goals on 19 January 2011, a penalty kick in a 3–2 victory at Deportivo de La Coruña (4–2 on aggregate), with them reaching the semi-finals of the Copa del Rey for the first time ever; he added one more in the competition, against Real Sociedad. However, he again only netted once in the league, in a 2–2 home draw with Atlético Madrid, and the club returned to the second tier after four years.

In mid-August 2012, Goitom terminated his contract.

=== AIK ===
On 16 August 2012, Goitom signed with his hometown club AIK Fotboll in the Allsvenskan. In November 2015, it was announced he would be released when his contract ended on 31 December.

=== Getafe ===
On 22 March 2016, after being unemployed for almost three months, Goitom agreed to a short-term deal at Getafe CF. He made his debut about a week later, coming on as a second half-substitute in a 2–0 away loss against Rayo Vallecano.

Goitom only totalled 124 minutes of action during his spell, and his team suffered top-flight relegation.

=== San Jose Earthquakes ===
On 10 August 2016, Goitom joined San Jose Earthquakes on a free transfer. He made his Major League Soccer debut nine days later, coming from the bench in a 1–2 defeat to Houston Dynamo at the Avaya Stadium.

At the end of the season, where he only started in two of his appearances, it was announced that Goitom would not be retained.

=== Return to AIK ===
On 3 March 2017, Goitom signed a two-year deal with former side AIK, thus returning to his birth country and its main division. In February of the following year, he became team captain.

== International career ==
=== Sweden ===
Goitom was a regular starter for the Swedish under-21 team during 2006, and played for the nation during qualification for the 2006 and 2007 UEFA European Championships. He was never called up to the full side, although he was considered for a place in the squad for a Euro 2016 qualifier against Russia.

=== Eritrea ===
In September 2015, aged 30, Goitom made an official request to FIFA for permission to play for Eritrea. He made his debut on 10 October, in a 2–0 home loss to Botswana for the 2018 FIFA World Cup qualifiers. He scored in the return leg, in a final 5–1 aggregate defeat.

== Coaching career ==
Goitom announced his retirement after the 2021 season, aged 37. On 19 August 2022, he was appointed interim manager of his last club.

On 8 July 2025, Goitom became head coach of Degerfors IF, newly promoted from the Superettan. Five days later, his team lost 3–0 at AIK.

== Career statistics ==
=== Club ===
Appearances and goals by club, season and competition
Club	Season	League			National Cup		Continental		Total	
Club	Season	Division	Apps	Goals	Apps	Goals	Apps	Goals	Apps	Goals
Udinese	2003–04	Serie A	0	0	0	0	—		0	0
Udinese	2004–05	Serie A	1	1	1	0	—		2	1
Udinese	2005–06	Serie A	0	0	0	0	—		0	0
Udinese	2006–07	Serie A	0	0	0	0	—		0	0
Udinese	Total		1	1	1	0	—		2	1
Ciudad Murcia (loan)	2005–06	Segunda División	37	8	0	0	—		37	8
Ciudad Murcia (loan)	2006–07	Segunda División	38	15	0	0	—		38	15
Ciudad Murcia (loan)	Total		75	23	0	0	—		75	23
Murcia	2007–08	La Liga	31	2	2	0	—		33	2
Valladolid (loan)	2008–09	La Liga	29	10	2	1	—		31	11
Almería	2009–10	La Liga	21	1	0	0	—		21	1
Almería	2010–11	La Liga	26	1	5	2	—		31	3
Almería	2011–12	Segunda División	31	6	3	1	—		34	7
Almería	Total		78	8	8	3	—		86	11
AIK	2012	Allsvenskan	9	1	1	0	2	1	12	2
AIK	2013	Allsvenskan	27	8	3	1	—		30	9
AIK	2014	Allsvenskan	28	12	1	1	4	1	33	14
AIK	2015	Allsvenskan	29	18	4	3	6	6	39	27
AIK	Total		93	39	9	5	12	8	114	52
Getafe	2015–16	La Liga	2	0	0	0	—		2	0
San Jose Earthquakes	2016	Major League Soccer	8	0	0	0	—		8	0
AIK	2017	Allsvenskan	24	5	2	1	5	1	31	7
AIK	2018	Allsvenskan	30	12	6	1	4	0	40	13
AIK	2019	Allsvenskan	30	11	5	1	8	3	43	15
AIK	2020	Allsvenskan	29	8	4	2	0	0	33	10
AIK	2021	Allsvenskan	29	3	0	0	—		29	3
AIK	Total		142	39	17	5	17	4	176	48
Career total			459	122	39	14	29	12	527	148

=== International ===
Appearances and goals by national team and year

National team	Year	Apps	Goals
Eritrea	2015	2	1
Eritrea	2016	0	0
Eritrea	2017	0	0
Eritrea	2018	0	0
Eritrea	2019	2	0
	Total	4	1

Scores and results list Eritrea's goal tally first, score column indicates score after each Goitom goal.

#	Date	Venue	Opponent	Score	Result	Competition	Ref
1.	13 October 2015	Francistown Stadium, Francistown, Botswana	Botswana	1–0	1–3	2018 FIFA World Cup qualification	

== Honours ==
AIK

- Allsvenskan: 2018
