= 2020 in Swedish football =

Football in Sweden
- Season: 2020

Men's football
- Allsvenskan: Malmö FF
- Svenska Cupen: IFK Göteborg

The 2020 season was the 123rd season of competitive football in Sweden. The men's team participated UEFA Euro 2020 as well as in the 2020–21 UEFA Nations League, and the women's team qualified for the UEFA Women's Euro 2021.

== Domestic results ==
=== Men's football ===
==== 2020 Allsvenskan ====
Pos	Team	Pld	W	D	L	GF	GA	GD	Pts	Qualification or relegation
1	Malmö FF (C)	30	17	9	4	64	30	+34	60	Qualification for the Champions League first qualifying round
2	IF Elfsborg	30	12	15	3	49	38	+11	51	Qualification for the Europa Conference League second qualifying round
3	BK Häcken	30	12	13	5	45	29	+16	49	Qualification for the Europa Conference League second qualifying round
4	Djurgårdens IF	30	14	6	10	48	33	+15	48	
5	Mjällby AIF	30	13	8	9	48	44	+4	47	
6	IFK Norrköping	30	13	7	10	60	46	+14	46	
7	Örebro SK	30	12	6	12	37	41	−4	42	
8	Hammarby IF	30	10	11	9	47	47	0	41	Qualification for the Europa Conference League second qualifying round (Note: Hammarby IF qualified for the Europa Conference League second qualifying round by winning the 2020–21 Svenska Cupen.)
9	AIK	30	10	9	11	30	33	−3	39	
10	IK Sirius	30	9	11	10	43	51	−8	38	
11	Varbergs BoIS	30	10	7	13	45	44	+1	37	
12	IFK Göteborg	30	7	13	10	35	41	−6	34	
13	Östersunds FK	30	8	9	13	27	46	−19	33	
14	Kalmar FF (O)	30	6	10	14	30	49	−19	28	Qualification for the relegation play-offs
15	Helsingborgs IF (R)	30	5	11	14	33	48	−15	26	Relegation to Superettan
16	Falkenbergs FF (R)	30	5	9	16	33	54	−21	24	Relegation to Superettan

Source: svenskfotboll.se (in Swedish)
Rules for classification: 1) Points; 2) Goal difference; 3) Goals scored; 4) Head-to-head points; 5) Head-to-head goal difference; 6) Head-to-head away goals scored; 7) Play-off
(Note: Play-off is only played if need to decide champion, teams for relegation or UEFA competition and will be played on a neutral ground).
(C) Champions; (O) Play-off winners; (R) Relegated

==== 2021 Allsvenskan play-offs ====
9 December 2020
18:00 (UTC+1)

Jönköpings Södra IF	1–3	Kalmar FF
Lowe 3'	Report	Lowe 11' (o.g.); Ring 19'; Herrem 55'

Stadsparksvallen, Jönköping
Referee: Mohammed Al-Hakim
13 December 2020
13:00 (UTC+1)

Kalmar FF	1–0	Jönköpings Södra IF
Fröling 80'	Report

Guldfågeln Arena, Kalmar
Referee: Glenn Nyberg

Kalmar FF won 4–1 on aggregate.

==== 2020 Superettan ====
Pos	Team	Pld	W	D	L	GF	GA	GD	Pts	Promotion, qualification or relegation
1	Halmstads BK (C, P)	30	21	5	4	61	18	+43	68	Promotion to Allsvenskan
2	Degerfors IF (P)	30	19	6	5	64	30	+34	63	Promotion to Allsvenskan
3	Jönköpings Södra IF	30	18	5	7	52	34	+18	59	Qualification to promotion play-offs
4	Östers IF	30	15	6	9	41	36	+5	51	
5	Akropolis IF	30	10	15	5	44	39	+5	45	
6	GIF Sundsvall	30	12	7	11	53	48	+5	43	
7	Västerås SK	30	11	6	13	40	44	−4	39	
8	IK Brage	30	11	6	13	38	44	−6	39	
9	AFC Eskilstuna	30	11	4	15	36	49	−13	37	
10	GAIS	30	9	9	12	30	41	−11	36	
11	Norrby IF	30	8	10	12	39	41	−2	34	
12	Örgryte IS	30	9	6	15	34	43	−9	33	
13	Trelleborgs FF (O)	30	8	8	14	33	41	−8	32	Qualification to relegation play-offs
14	Dalkurd FF (R)	30	6	11	13	33	42	−9	29	Qualification to relegation play-offs
15	Umeå FC (R)	30	5	12	13	25	47	−22	27	Relegation to Ettan
16	Ljungskile SK (R)	30	5	8	17	24	50	−26	23	Relegation to Ettan

Source: svenskfotboll.se (in Swedish)
Rules for classification: 1) Points; 2) Goal difference; 3) Number of goals scored; 4) Head-to-head points; 5) Head-to-head goal difference; 6) Head-to-head away goals scored
(C) Champions; (O) Play-off winners; (P) Promoted; (R) Relegated

==== 2021 Superettan play-offs ====
9 December 2020
18:00 (UTC+1)

Landskrona BoIS	2–0	Dalkurd FF
L. Olsson 25'; Petersson 51'	Report

Landskrona IP, Landskrona
Referee: Per Melin
13 December 2020
15:00 (UTC+1)

Dalkurd FF	1–1	Landskrona BoIS
Holm 46'	Report	F. Olsson 80'

Nya Studenternas, Uppsala
Referee: Victor Wolf

Landskrona BoIS won 3–1 on aggregate.

9 December 2020
18:00 (UTC+1)

IF Brommapojkarna	1–1	Trelleborgs FF
Fallenius 82'	Report	Safiu 89'

Grimsta IP, Stockholm
Referee: Granit Maqedonci
13 December 2020
15:00 (UTC+1)

Trelleborgs FF	1–1 (a.e.t.)	IF Brommapojkarna
Håkansson 26'	Report	Nilsson 90+2'
Penalties
Camara Jönsson (penalty scored); E. Andersson (penalty scored); Björkén (penalty scored); Safiu (penalty scored)	4–1	(penalty missed) Haglund; (penalty scored) Arvidsson; (penalty missed) Sandberg Magnusson

Vångavallen, Trelleborg
Referee: Fredrik Klitte

2–2 on aggregate. Trelleborgs FF won 4–1 on penalties.

== National teams ==
=== Sweden men's national football team ===
==== 2020–21 UEFA Nations League ====
===== Group A3 =====
Pos	Team	Pld	W	D	L	GF	GA	GD	Pts	Qualification or relegation
1	France	6	5	1	0	12	5	+7	16	Qualification for Nations League Finals
2	Portugal	6	4	1	1	12	4	+8	13	
3	Croatia	6	1	0	5	9	16	−7	3 (Note: Tied on head-to-head results. Overall goal difference was used as the tiebreaker.)	
4	Sweden (R)	6	1	0	5	5	13	−8	3	Relegation to League B

Source: UEFA
Rules for classification: Tiebreakers
(R) Relegated
Notes:

Win Draw Loss

5 September 2020 1	Sweden	0–1	France	Solna, Sweden
20:45 (UTC+2)	Lindelöf (yellow card) 90+4'	Report	Upamecano (yellow card) 2'; Mbappé 41'	Stadium: Friends Arena; Attendance: 0 Referee: (Poland) Szymon Marciniak

8 September 2020 2	Sweden	0–2	Portugal	Solna, Sweden
20:45 (UTC+2)	Svensson (yellow card) 14' (yellow-red card) 44'	Report	Ronaldo 45', 72'; Guerreiro (yellow card) 56'; Félix (yellow card) 86'	Stadium: Friends Arena; Attendance: 0 Referee: (Netherlands) Danny Makkelie

9 October 2020 3	Croatia	2–1	Sweden	Zagreb, Croatia
20:45 (UTC+2)	Kovačić (yellow card) 2'; Vlašić 31'; Brozović (yellow card) 45'; Kramarić 84'	Report	Berg 66'; Larsson (yellow card) 90+4'	Stadium: Stadion Maksimir; Attendance: 2,020; Referee: (Scotland) John Beaton

12 October 2020 4	Portugal	3–0	Sweden	Lisbon, Portugal
19:45 (UTC+1)	B. Silva 21'; Jota 44', 72', (yellow card) 52'; Fernandes (yellow card) 85'	Report	Ekdal (yellow card) 36'; Olsson (yellow card) 57'; Jansson (yellow card) 61'; Berg (yellow card) 79'	Stadium: Estádio José Alvalade; Attendance: 5,000; Referee: (Serbia) Srđan Jovanović

12 November 2020 5	Sweden	2–1	Croatia	Solna, Sweden
20:45 (UTC+1)	Kulusevski 36'; Danielson 45+2'; Ekdal (yellow card) 86'	Report	Ćaleta-Car (yellow card) 35'; Brekalo (yellow card) 68'; Danielson 81' (o.g.)	Stadium: Friends Arena; Attendance: 0 Referee: (Germany) Daniel Siebert

15 November 2020 6	France	4–2	Sweden	Saint-Denis, France
20:45 (UTC+1)	Giroud 16', 59'; Pavard 36'; Coman 90+4'	Report	Claesson 4'; Olsson (yellow card) 28'; Quaison 88'; Larsson (yellow card) 90+2'	Stadium: Stade de France; Attendance: 0 Referee: (Belarus) Aleksei Kulbakov

==== Friendlies ====
Win Draw Loss

9 January 2020	Sweden	1–0	Moldova	Doha, Qatar
20:00 (UTC+3)	Larsson 32'	Report		Stadium: Hamad bin Khalifa Stadium; Referee: Saoud Al Athbah (Qatar)

12 January 2020	Sweden	1–0	Kosovo	Doha, Qatar
17:45 (UTC+3)	Hedlund 75'	Report		Stadium: Hamad bin Khalifa Stadium; Referee: Mohammed Al-Shammari (Qatar)

11 November 2020	Denmark	2–0	Sweden	Brøndby, Denmark
19:30 UTC+1	Wind 61'; Bah 74'	Report		Stadium: Brøndby Stadium; Attendance: 141; Referee: Espen Eskås (Norway)

=== Sweden women's national football team ===
==== UEFA Women's Euro 2021 qualifying ====
===== Group F =====
Pos	Team	Pld	W	D	L	GF	GA	GD	Pts	Qualification
1	Sweden	8	7	1	0	40	2	+38	22	Final tournament
2	Iceland	8	6	1	1	25	5	+20	19	Final tournament
3	Slovakia	8	3	1	4	7	19	−12	10	
4	Hungary	8	2	1	5	11	20	−9	7	
5	Latvia	8	0	0	8	2	39	−37	0	

Source: UEFA

Win Draw Loss

14 April 2020 2021UWEQ	Sweden	8–0	Hungary	Gothenburg, Sweden
18:00 (UTC+2)	Hurtig 11', 69'; Seger (yellow card) 55'; Anvegård 59', 64', 72'; Eriksson 67'; Ilestedt 71'; Hammarlund (yellow card) 83'; Sembrant 90'	Report	Németh (yellow card) 38'; Bíró (red card) 41'; Turányi (yellow card) 51'	Stadium: Gamla Ullevi; Attendance: 0 Referee: (England) Rebecca Welch

9 June 2020 2021UWEQ	Iceland	1–1	Sweden	Reykjavík, Iceland
(UTC)	Jensen 61'	Report	Anvegård 33'	Stadium: Laugardalsvöllur; Attendance: 0 Referee: (Croatia) Ivana Martinčić

17 September 2020 2021UWEQ	Sweden	v	Latvia	Gothenburg, Sweden
(UTC+2)				Stadium: Gamla Ullevi

22 September 2020 2021UWEQ	Sweden	v	Iceland	Gothenburg, Sweden
(UTC+2)				Stadium: Gamla Ullevi

4 June 2020 2021UWEQ	Slovakia	v	Sweden	Trnava, Slovakia
(UTC+2)				Stadium: Anton Malatinský Stadium

==== 2020 Algarve Cup ====
Win Draw Loss

4 March 2020 Qualification	Germany	1–0	Sweden	Faro, Portugal
16:30 (UTC)	Huth 34'	Report		Stadium: Estádio Algarve; Attendance: 800; Referee: Ivana Martinčić (Croatia)

7 March 2020 5-8th place semi-finals	Sweden	1–2	Denmark	Lagos, Portugal
14:30 (UTC)	Hurtig 11'	Report	S. Larsen 56'; Christiansen 90+3'	Stadium: Estádio Municipal de Lagos; Referee: Francia González (Mexico)

10 March 2020 7th place game	Portugal	0–2	Sweden	Faro, Portugal
20:00 (UTC)		Report	Jakobsson 45+2'; Rolfö 51'	Stadium: Estádio Algarve
