= 2020 Superettan =

Superettan
- Season: 2020
- Champions: Halmstads BK
- Promoted: Halmstads BK; Degerfors IF
- Relegated: Dalkurd FF; Umeå FC; Ljungskile SK
- Top goalscorer: Pontus Engblom (20 goals)
- Biggest home win: Norrby IF 6–0 Umeå FC (21 November 2020)
- Biggest away win: Umeå FC 0–6 Degerfors IF (21 September 2020); GIF Sundsvall 0–6 Halmstads BK (21 November 2020)
- Highest scoring: GIF Sundsvall 5–2 Ljungskile SK (7 August 2020); Degerfors IF 2–5 GIF Sundsvall (28 November 2020)
- Longest winning run: 9 matches Halmstads BK
- Longest unbeaten run: 11 matches Degerfors IF; Akropolis IF
- Longest winless run: 10 matches GAIS
- Longest losing run: 5 matches GIF Sundsvall; Örgryte IS

The 2020 Superettan was part of the 2020 Swedish football season, and the 21st season of Superettan, Sweden's second-tier football division in its current format. A total of 16 teams contest the league.

== Teams ==
A total of 16 teams contest the league. The top two teams qualify directly for promotion to Allsvenskan, the third will enter a play-off for the chance of promotion. The two bottom teams are automatically relegated, while the 13th and 14th placed teams will compete in a play-off to determine whether they are relegated.

=== Stadia and locations ===
Locations of the 2020 Superettan teams

Team	Location	Stadium	Stadium capacity (Note: According to each club information page at the Swedish Football Association website for Allsvenskan.)
AFC Eskilstuna	Eskilstuna	Tunavallen	7,800
Akropolis IF	Spånga	Grimsta IP	5,000
Dalkurd FF	Uppsala	Nya Studenternas	10,000
Degerfors IF	Degerfors	Stora Valla	12,500
GAIS	Gothenburg	Gamla Ullevi	18,416
GIF Sundsvall	Sundsvall	Idrottsparken (Note: Known as NP3 Arena for sponsorship reasons.)	7,700
Halmstads BK	Halmstad	Örjans Vall	10,873
IK Brage	Borlänge	Domnarvsvallen	6,500
Jönköpings Södra IF	Jönköping	Stadsparksvallen	5,500
Ljungskile SK	Ljungskile	Skarsjövallen	8,000
Norrby IF	Borås	Borås Arena	17,800
Trelleborgs FF	Trelleborg	Vångavallen	7,000
Umeå FC	Umeå	Gammliavallen (Note: Known as Umeå Energi Arena for sponsorship reasons.)	10,000
Västerås SK	Västerås	Iver Arena	7,000
Örgryte IS	Gothenburg	Gamla Ullevi	18,416
Östers IF	Växjö	Visma Arena	12,000

== League table ==
Pos	Team	Pld	W	D	L	GF	GA	GD	Pts	Promotion, qualification or relegation
1	Halmstads BK (C, P)	30	21	5	4	61	18	+43	68	Promotion to Allsvenskan
2	Degerfors IF (P)	30	19	6	5	64	30	+34	63	Promotion to Allsvenskan
3	Jönköpings Södra IF	30	18	5	7	52	34	+18	59	Qualification to promotion play-offs
4	Östers IF	30	15	6	9	41	36	+5	51	
5	Akropolis IF	30	10	15	5	44	39	+5	45	
6	GIF Sundsvall	30	12	7	11	53	48	+5	43	
7	Västerås SK	30	11	6	13	40	44	−4	39	
8	IK Brage	30	11	6	13	38	44	−6	39	
9	AFC Eskilstuna	30	11	4	15	36	49	−13	37	
10	GAIS	30	9	9	12	30	41	−11	36	
11	Norrby IF	30	8	10	12	39	41	−2	34	
12	Örgryte IS	30	9	6	15	34	43	−9	33	
13	Trelleborgs FF (O)	30	8	8	14	33	41	−8	32	Qualification to relegation play-offs
14	Dalkurd FF (R)	30	6	11	13	33	42	−9	29	Qualification to relegation play-offs
15	Umeå FC (R)	30	5	12	13	25	47	−22	27	Relegation to Ettan
16	Ljungskile SK (R)	30	5	8	17	24	50	−26	23	Relegation to Ettan

Source: svenskfotboll.se (in Swedish)
Rules for classification: 1) Points; 2) Goal difference; 3) Number of goals scored; 4) Head-to-head points; 5) Head-to-head goal difference; 6) Head-to-head away goals scored
(C) Champions; (O) Play-off winners; (P) Promoted; (R) Relegated

=== Playoffs ===
The 13th-placed and 14th-placed teams of Superettan met the two runners-up from 2020 Division 1 (Norra and Södra) in two-legged ties on a home-and-away basis with the teams from Superettan finishing at home.

9 December 2020
18:00

Landskrona BoIS	2–0	Dalkurd FF
L. Olsson 25'; Petersson 51'	Report

Landskrona IP, Landskrona
Referee: Per Melin
13 December 2020
15:00

Dalkurd FF	1–1	Landskrona BoIS
Holm 46'	Report	F. Olsson 80'

Nya Studenternas, Uppsala
Referee: Victor Wolf

Landskrona BoIS won 3–1 on aggregate.

9 December 2020
18:00

IF Brommapojkarna	1–1	Trelleborgs FF
Fallenius 82'	Report	Safiu 89'

Grimsta IP, Stockholm
Referee: Granit Maqedonci
13 December 2020
15:00

Trelleborgs FF	1–1 (a.e.t.)	IF Brommapojkarna
Håkansson 26'	Report	Nilsson 90+2'
Penalties
Camara Jönsson (penalty scored); E. Andersson (penalty scored); Björkén (penalty scored); Safiu (penalty scored)	4–1	(penalty missed) Haglund; (penalty scored) Arvidsson; (penalty missed) Sandberg Magnusson

Vångavallen, Trelleborg
Referee: Fredrik Klitte

2–2 on aggregate. Trelleborgs FF won 4–1 on penalties.

=== Positions by round ===
Team ╲ Round	1	2	3	4	5	6	7	8	9	10	11	12	13	14	15	16	17	18	19	20	21	22	23	24	25	26	27	28	29	30
Halmstads BK	12	7	3	3	3	2	1	2	2	2	2	2	2	2	2	2	2	2	2	2	2	2	2	2	2	2	2	1	1	1
Degerfors IF	1	4	8	4	4	3	2	1	1	1	1	1	1	1	1	1	1	1	1	1	1	1	1	1	1	1	1	2	2	2
Jönköpings Södra IF	14	8	13	7	10	12	8	7	6	5	4	3	5	5	4	3	3	3	3	3	3	3	3	3	3	3	3	3	3	3
Östers IF	4	2	2	2	2	4	5	5	8	7	8	10	9	7	6	5	5	5	5	4	4	4	4	4	4	4	4	4	4	4
Akropolis IF	8	12	6	11	8	9	6	4	4	6	5	5	4	4	3	4	4	4	4	5	5	5	5	5	6	6	6	5	5	5
GIF Sundsvall	2	1	1	1	1	1	3	3	3	3	3	4	3	3	5	6	8	8	7	6	7	7	6	6	5	5	5	6	6	6
Västerås SK	7	5	7	6	9	6	9	11	11	14	12	12	11	11	12	11	11	11	12	12	13	12	9	8	8	8	8	8	7	7
IK Brage	16	15	12	14	6	5	4	6	5	4	6	6	7	6	7	7	6	6	6	7	6	6	7	7	7	7	7	7	8	8
AFC Eskilstuna	13	16	16	16	16	16	16	15	15	15	15	16	16	16	15	16	16	15	15	14	11	10	14	10	13	13	14	13	10	9
GAIS	5	11	14	15	7	10	11	12	12	13	13	13	13	13	14	14	12	12	10	9	8	8	8	9	10	9	9	11	11	10
Norrby IF	11	6	4	5	5	7	7	8	7	8	7	7	10	10	8	10	9	9	9	10	10	11	13	14	12	12	13	12	9	11
Örgryte IS	3	10	15	8	11	13	14	14	14	11	9	9	8	9	10	8	7	7	8	8	9	9	10	11	9	11	12	10	13	12
Trelleborgs FF	6	9	11	13	14	8	10	9	9	9	11	8	6	8	9	9	10	10	11	11	12	14	12	13	14	14	11	9	12	13
Dalkurd FF	9	3	5	9	12	11	12	13	13	10	10	11	12	12	11	12	13	13	13	13	14	13	11	12	11	10	10	14	14	14
Umeå FC	15	13	9	10	13	14	13	10	10	12	14	14	14	14	13	13	14	14	14	15	15	15	15	15	15	15	15	15	15	15
Ljungskile SK	10	14	10	12	15	15	15	16	16	16	16	15	15	15	16	15	15	16	16	16	16	16	16	16	16	16	16	16	16	16

Promotion to Allsvenskan
Promotion play-offs
Relegation play-offs
Relegation to Division 1

Source: everysport.com

== Results ==
Home \ Away	AKR	BRA	DAL	DEG	ESK	GAI	GIF	HAL	JÖN	LJU	NOR	TRE	UME	VÄS	ÖRG	ÖST
Akropolis		2–1	0–0	1–1	3–2	2–2	1–1	1–1	1–1	1–0	1–3	2–2	3–3	2–0	2–0	2–2
Brage	1–1		2–1	0–0	1–3	2–1	1–2	0–0	1–4	0–1	1–1	3–0	0–1	0–3	3–2	1–2
Dalkurd	1–1	1–1		1–2	5–0	0–1	1–3	1–1	1–1	2–0	2–2	0–1	0–0	3–2	0–0	1–1
Degerfors	3–2	4–1	2–1		5–0	2–1	2–5	0–2	4–2	4–1	0–1	1–0	1–0	4–1	2–0	3–1
Eskilstuna	1–2	1–2	0–1	2–0		2–0	3–2	0–3	3–2	0–0	1–0	3–2	1–3	0–1	1–0	1–1
GAIS	1–1	0–1	2–1	0–0	2–0		3–1	1–3	1–0	1–1	3–3	2–1	1–1	1–0	0–0	0–1
GIF Sundsvall	1–2	0–1	1–1	1–4	2–3	3–0		0–6	3–2	5–2	0–0	2–1	3–1	3–1	4–1	1–2
Halmstad	2–3	2–0	4–0	1–4	2–1	0–0	1–0		3–0	2–0	3–0	0–1	4–0	2–1	1–0	2–0
Jönköpings Södra	3–1	2–0	2–1	0–1	3–0	1–0	3–3	1–0		2–1	1–0	2–1	1–0	1–1	2–0	4–1
Ljungskile	2–1	1–3	2–2	0–3	2–1	1–2	0–0	0–0	0–1		1–1	2–0	0–0	0–2	2–3	0–2
Norrby	1–1	1–4	2–0	0–2	0–0	3–0	0–1	0–2	1–2	2–2		1–3	6–0	3–1	2–0	0–2
Trelleborg	1–1	0–1	4–1	1–1	1–1	2–0	1–1	2–4	0–2	1–0	2–2		1–1	1–0	1–1	0–1
Umeå	1–1	1–1	1–2	0–6	0–3	3–0	1–0	0–1	1–2	3–1	1–1	0–1		0–0	2–2	0–0
Västerås	2–1	2–1	1–0	2–2	0–1	2–2	3–2	2–3	2–2	2–1	1–2	3–1	2–0		0–3	2–1
Örgryte	0–1	1–3	1–2	1–1	2–1	0–2	0–2	0–3	2–0	4–0	2–0	2–1	1–1	2–1		4–1
Öster	0–1	4–2	2–1	2–0	2–1	4–1	1–1	0–3	1–3	0–1	2–1	1–0	2–0	0–0	2–0	

Source: svenskfotboll.se (in Swedish)
Legend: Blue = home team win; Yellow = draw; Red = away team win.

== Season statistics ==
=== Top scorers ===
As of 5 December 2020

Rank	Player	Club	Goals
1	(Sweden) Pontus Engblom	GIF Sundsvall	20
2	(Sweden) Johan Bertilsson	Degerfors IF	19
3	(Sweden) Victor Edvardsen	Degerfors IF	15
4	(Nigeria) Samuel Nnamani	AFC Eskilstuna	13
4	(Sweden) Rasmus Wiedesheim-Paul	Halmstads BK	13
6	(Sweden) Mikael Boman	Halmstads BK	12
7	(Sweden) Edin Hamidović	Jönköpings Södra IF	11
8	(Sweden) Villiam Dahlström	Degerfors IF	10

=== Hat-tricks ===
Player	For	Against	Result	Date
(Sweden) Rasmus Wiedesheim-Paul	Halmstads BK	Jönköpings Södra IF	3–0	27 June 2020
(Sweden) Anton Lundin	IK Brage	Ljungskile SK	1–3	8 July 2020
(Ghana) Fatawu Safiu	Trelleborgs FF	Dalkurd FF	4–1	25 July 2020
(Sweden) Johan Bertilsson	Degerfors IF	Östers IF	3–1	29 July 2020
(Sweden) Robin Strömberg	Norrby IF	Västerås SK	3–1	13 September 2020
(Sweden) Rasmus Wiedesheim-Paul	Halmstads BK	Umeå FC	4–0	16 September 2020
(Sweden) Johan Bertilsson	Degerfors IF	Umeå FC	0–6	21 September 2020
(The Gambia) Bubacarr Jobe	Örgryte IS	Östers IF	4–1	24 October 2020

=== Discipline ===
==== Player ====
- Most yellow cards: 9
  - (Sweden) Enis Ahmetovic (Umeå)
  - (Sweden) Filip Almström Tähti (Västerås)
  - (England) James Keene (Öster)
  - (Sweden) Oscar Lundin (Brage)
- Most red cards: 2
  - (Sweden) Linus Dahl (Ljungskile)

==== Club ====
- Most yellow cards: 59
  - IK Brage
- Most red cards: 5
  - Jönköpings Södra IF
