= 2016 UEFA European Under-17 Championship squads =

The following is a list of squads for each national team competing at the 2016 UEFA European Under-17 Championship in Azerbaijan. Each national team had to submit a squad of 18 players born on or after 1 January 1999.

Players in boldface have been capped at full international level at some point in their career.

== Group A ==
=== Azerbaijan ===
Head coach: Tabriz Hasanov

No.	Pos.	Player	Date of birth (age)	Club
1	GK	Mammad Huseynov	29 May 1999 (aged 16)	(Association of Football Federations of Azerbaijan) Qarabağ
2	DF	Huseyin Seyliğli	19 January 1999 (aged 17)	(Turkish Football Federation) Beşiktaş
3	DF	Rijat Garayev	7 September 1999 (aged 16)	(Association of Football Federations of Azerbaijan) Sumgayit
4	DF	Yusif Hasanov	30 November 1999 (aged 16)	(Association of Football Federations of Azerbaijan) Khazar Lankaran
5	MF	Elchin Asadov	3 August 1999 (aged 16)	(Association of Football Federations of Azerbaijan) Neftçi
6	MF	Ibrahim Gadirzade	21 March 1999 (aged 17)	(Association of Football Federations of Azerbaijan) Khazar Lankaran
7	MF	Farid Nabiyev	22 July 1999 (aged 16)	(Association of Football Federations of Azerbaijan) Gabala
8	MF	Metin Güler	10 September 1999 (aged 16)	(Turkish Football Federation) Beşiktaş
9	FW	Dogukan Öksüz	25 February 1999 (aged 17)	(Turkish Football Federation) Trabzonspor
10	MF	Pilagha Mehdiyev	25 May 1999 (aged 16)	(Association of Football Federations of Azerbaijan) Neftçi
11	FW	Nadir Gasimov	27 August 1999 (aged 16)	(Association of Football Federations of Azerbaijan) Inter Baku
12	GK	Kamran Ibrahimov	7 June 1999 (aged 16)	(Association of Football Federations of Azerbaijan) Neftçi
14	DF	Ismayil Karakash	8 January 1999 (aged 17)	(Turkish Football Federation) Trabzonspor
15	MF	Jeyhun Mukhtarli	30 September 1999 (aged 16)	(Association of Football Federations of Azerbaijan) Inter Baku
16	FW	Murad Mahmudov	7 May 2000 (aged 15)	(German Football Association) RB Leipzig
17	MF	Baris Ekincier	24 March 1999 (aged 17)	(German Football Association) Rot-Weiss Essen
18	MF	Suleyman Ahmadov	25 November 1999 (aged 16)	(Association of Football Federations of Azerbaijan) Inter Baku
19	DF	Ege Atlam	1 May 1999 (aged 17)	(Turkish Football Federation) Beşiktaş

=== Belgium ===
Head coach: Thierry Siquet

No.	Pos.	Player	Date of birth (age)	Club
1	GK	**Mile Svilar**	27 August 1999 (aged 16)	(Royal Belgian Football Association) Anderlecht
2	DF	**Sebastiaan Bornauw**	22 March 1999 (aged 17)	(Royal Belgian Football Association) Anderlecht
3	DF	**Zinho Vanheusden**	29 July 1999 (aged 16)	(Italian Football Federation) Inter
4	DF	**Hannes Delcroix**	28 February 1999 (aged 17)	(Royal Belgian Football Association) Anderlecht
5	DF	Daam Foulon	23 March 1999 (aged 17)	(Royal Belgian Football Association) Anderlecht
6	DF	Daouda Peeters	26 January 1999 (aged 17)	(Royal Belgian Football Association) Club Brugge
7	FW	Thibaud Verlinden	9 July 1999 (aged 16)	(The Football Association) Stoke City
8	MF	Milan Corryn	4 April 1999 (aged 17)	(Royal Belgian Football Association) Anderlecht
9	FW	Jules Vanhaecke	17 March 1999 (aged 17)	(Royal Belgian Football Association) Club Brugge
10	MF	Francesco Antonucci	20 June 1999 (aged 16)	(Royal Dutch Football Association) Ajax
11	FW	Adrien Bongiovanni	20 September 1999 (aged 16)	(French Football Federation) AS Monaco
12	GK	Ilias Moutha-Sebtaoui	1 April 1999 (aged 17)	(The Football Association) Manchester United
13	MF	Natanaël Frenoy	8 January 1999 (aged 17)	(Royal Belgian Football Association) Standard Liège
14	MF	Xian Emmers	20 July 1999 (aged 16)	(Italian Football Federation) Inter
15	MF	Louis Verstraete	4 May 1999 (aged 17)	(Royal Belgian Football Association) Gent
16	FW	**Loïs Openda**	16 February 2000 (aged 16)	(Royal Belgian Football Association) Club Brugge
17	MF	Soufiane Karkache	2 July 1999 (aged 16)	(Royal Belgian Football Association) Club Brugge
18	MF	Indy Boonen	4 January 1999 (aged 17)	(The Football Association) Manchester United

=== Portugal ===
In April 2016, Portugal announced 18-man final squad.

Head coach: Hélio Sousa

No.	Pos.	Player	Date of birth (age)	Club
1	GK	**Diogo Costa**	19 September 1999 (aged 16)	(Portuguese Football Federation) Porto
2	DF	**Diogo Dalot**	18 March 1999 (aged 17)	(Portuguese Football Federation) Porto
3	DF	Diogo Queirós	5 January 1999 (aged 17)	(Portuguese Football Federation) Porto
4	DF	Luís Silva	18 February 1999 (aged 17)	(The Football Association) Stoke City
5	DF	Rúben Vinagre	9 April 1999 (aged 17)	(French Football Federation) Monaco
6	MF	**Gedson Fernandes**	9 January 1999 (aged 17)	(Portuguese Football Federation) Benfica
7	FW	João Filipe	29 March 1999 (aged 17)	(Portuguese Football Federation) Benfica
8	MF	Miguel Luís	27 February 1999 (aged 17)	(Portuguese Football Federation) Sporting
9	FW	José Gomes	8 April 1999 (aged 17)	(Portuguese Football Federation) Benfica
10	MF	Domingos Quina	18 November 1999 (aged 16)	(The Football Association) West Ham United
11	FW	Mesaque Djú	18 March 1999 (aged 17)	(Portuguese Football Federation) Benfica
12	GK	João Virgínia	10 October 1999 (aged 16)	(The Football Association) Arsenal
13	DF	Diogo Leite	23 January 1999 (aged 17)	(Portuguese Football Federation) Porto
14	MF	Florentino Luís	19 August 1999 (aged 16)	(Portuguese Football Federation) Benfica
15	DF	Thierry Correia	9 March 1999 (aged 17)	(Portuguese Football Federation) Sporting
16	MF	João Lameira	19 April 1999 (aged 17)	(Portuguese Football Federation) Porto
17	FW	**Rafael Leão**	10 June 1999 (aged 16)	(Portuguese Football Federation) Sporting
18	FW	Mickaël Almeida	27 January 1999 (aged 17)	(French Football Federation) Olympique Lyon
22	GK	Luís Maximiano	5 January 1999 (aged 17)	(Portuguese Football Federation) Sporting

=== Scotland ===
Head coach: Scot Gemmill

No.	Pos.	Player	Date of birth (age)	Club
1	GK	Aidan McAdams	23 March 1999 (aged 17)	(Scottish Football Association) Celtic
2	DF	Dan Meredith	14 September 1999 (aged 16)	(The Football Association) West Bromwich Albion
3	DF	Kieran Freeman	30 March 2000 (aged 16)	(Scottish Football Association) Dundee United
4	DF	Aidan Wilson	2 January 1999 (aged 17)	(Scottish Football Association) Rangers
5	DF	Daniel Baur	5 July 1999 (aged 16)	(Scottish Football Association) Heart of Midlothian
6	MF	Jordan Holsgrove	10 September 1999 (aged 16)	(The Football Association) Reading
7	FW	Jack Aitchison	5 March 2000 (aged 16)	(Scottish Football Association) Celtic
8	MF	Fraser Hornby	13 September 1999 (aged 16)	(The Football Association) Everton
9	FW	Lewis Morrison	12 March 1999 (aged 17)	(Scottish Football Association) Kilmarnock
10	MF	Liam Burt	1 February 1999 (aged 17)	(Scottish Football Association) Rangers
11	MF	Lee Connelly	18 October 1999 (aged 16)	(The Football Association) Queens Park Rangers
12	GK	Kieran Wright	1 April 1999 (aged 17)	(Scottish Football Association) Rangers
13	FW	Zak Rudden	6 February 2000 (aged 16)	(Scottish Football Association) Rangers
14	MF	Kyle McAllister	21 January 1999 (aged 17)	(Scottish Football Association) St Mirren
15	FW	Jack Adamson	7 January 1999 (aged 17)	(Scottish Football Association) Rangers
16	FW	Connor McLennan	5 October 1999 (aged 16)	(Scottish Football Association) Aberdeen
17	MF	Broque Watson	5 February 1999 (aged 17)	(Scottish Football Association) Celtic
18	DF	Liam Hegarty	12 February 1999 (aged 17)	(The Football Association) Middlesbrough

== Group B ==
=== Austria ===
Head coach: Andreas Heraf

No.	Pos.	Player	Date of birth (age)	Club
1	GK	Benjamin Ozegovic	9 August 1999 (aged 16)	(Austrian Football Association) Austria Wien
2	DF	Leonardo Zottele	16 April 1999 (aged 17)	(German Football Association) 1. FC Nürnberg
3	DF	Alexander Burgstaller	12 July 1999 (aged 16)	(Austrian Football Association) Red Bull Salzburg
4	DF	Aleksandar Borković	11 June 1999 (aged 16)	(Austrian Football Association) Austria Wien
5	DF	Luca Meisl	4 March 1999 (aged 17)	(Austrian Football Association) Red Bull Salzburg
6	MF	Valentino Müller	19 January 1999 (aged 17)	(Austrian Football Association) Altach
7	MF	Philipp Sittsam	16 February 1999 (aged 17)	(Austrian Football Association) AKA STMK-Sturm Graz
9	FW	Nicolas Meister	28 September 1999 (aged 16)	(Austrian Football Association) Red Bull Salzburg
10	MF	**Christoph Baumgartner**	1 August 1999 (aged 16)	(Austrian Football Association) AKA St. Pölten NÖ
11	MF	**Romano Schmid**	27 January 2000 (aged 16)	(Austrian Football Association) Sturm Graz
12	DF	Lukas Malicsek	6 June 1999 (aged 16)	(Austrian Football Association) Admira Wacker Mödling
13	MF	Dominik Fitz	16 June 1999 (aged 16)	(Austrian Football Association) Austria Wien
14	DF	Dario Maresic	29 September 1999 (aged 16)	(Austrian Football Association) Sturm Graz
16	MF	Jörg Wagnes	29 January 1999 (aged 17)	(Austrian Football Association) AKA STMK-Sturm Graz
17	FW	Maurice Mathis	9 May 1999 (aged 16)	(German Football Association) TSV 1860 München
18	FW	Kelvin Arase	15 January 1999 (aged 17)	(Austrian Football Association) Rapid Wien
20	DF	Christian Müller	10 February 1999 (aged 17)	(Austrian Football Association) AKA St. Pölten NÖ
21	GK	Semir Karalic	3 May 1999 (aged 17)	(Austrian Football Association) Admira Wacker Mödling

=== Bosnia and Herzegovina ===
Head coach: Sakib Malkočević

No.	Pos.	Player	Date of birth (age)	Club
1	GK	Filip Vasilj	22 November 1999 (aged 16)	(Croatian Football Federation) Lokomotiva
2	DF	Saša Perić	29 June 1999 (aged 16)	(Football Association of Serbia) Red Star Belgrade
3	DF	Amar Beširević	8 August 1999 (aged 16)	(Football Association of Bosnia and Herzegovina) Željezničar
4	MF	Jasmin Čeliković	7 January 1999 (aged 17)	(Croatian Football Federation) Rijeka
5	DF	Amir Velić	28 March 1999 (aged 17)	(Football Association of Bosnia and Herzegovina) Željezničar
6	DF	Milan Mirić	12 March 1999 (aged 17)	(Football Association of Serbia) Partizan
7	FW	Ševkija Resić	4 December 1999 (aged 16)	(Football Association of Bosnia and Herzegovina) Sarajevo
8	MF	Stefan Kovač	14 January 1999 (aged 17)	(Football Association of Serbia) Red Star Belgrade
9	FW	Tomas Dadić	2 April 1999 (aged 17)	(Croatian Football Federation) Dinamo Zagreb
10	MF	Demirel Veladžić	15 May 1999 (aged 16)	(Football Association of Bosnia and Herzegovina) Sarajevo
11	MF	Edis Smajić	10 September 1999 (aged 16)	(Football Association of Bosnia and Herzegovina) Sloboda Tuzla
12	GK	Filip Dujmović	12 March 1999 (aged 17)	(Football Association of Bosnia and Herzegovina) Zrinjski
13	FW	Nedim Hadžić	19 March 1999 (aged 17)	(Football Association of Bosnia and Herzegovina) Sarajevo
14	MF	Anel Šabanadžović	24 May 1999 (aged 16)	(Football Association of Bosnia and Herzegovina) Željezničar
15	DF	Nikola Vuletić	18 January 1999 (aged 17)	(Croatian Football Federation) Hajduk Split
16	DF	Rijad Sadiku	18 January 2000 (aged 16)	(Football Association of Bosnia and Herzegovina) Sarajevo
17	MF	Predrag Vladić	4 February 1999 (aged 17)	(Football Association of Serbia) Partizan
18	FW	Benjamin Hadžić	4 March 1999 (aged 17)	(German Football Association) Bayern Munich

=== Germany ===
Head coach: Meikel Schönweitz

No.	Pos.	Player	Date of birth (age)	Club
1	GK	Jan-Christoph Bartels	13 January 1999 (aged 17)	(German Football Association) Mainz 05
2	DF	**Alfons Amade**	12 November 1999 (aged 16)	(German Football Association) 1899 Hoffenheim
3	DF	Gian-Luca Itter	5 January 1999 (aged 17)	(German Football Association) VfL Wolfsburg
4	DF	Tom Baack	13 March 1999 (aged 17)	(German Football Association) VfL Bochum
5	DF	Florian Baak	18 March 1999 (aged 17)	(German Football Association) Hertha BSC
6	MF	Atakan Akkaynak	5 January 1999 (aged 17)	(German Football Association) Bayer 04 Leverkusen
7	MF	**Kai Havertz**	11 June 1999 (aged 16)	(German Football Association) Bayer 04 Leverkusen
8	MF	Arne Maier	8 January 1999 (aged 17)	(German Football Association) Hertha BSC
9	FW	**Renat Dadashov**	17 May 1999 (aged 16)	(German Football Association) RB Leipzig
10	MF	Sam Schreck	29 January 1999 (aged 17)	(German Football Association) FC St. Pauli
11	MF	Jano Baxmann	18 January 1999 (aged 17)	(German Football Association) Werder Bremen
12	GK	Lennart Grill	25 January 1999 (aged 17)	(German Football Association) Mainz 05
13	DF	Jan-Niklas Beste	4 January 1999 (aged 17)	(German Football Association) Borussia Dortmund
14	DF	Mika Hanraths	4 June 1999 (aged 16)	(German Football Association) Fortuna Düsseldorf
15	DF	Sven Sonnenberg	19 January 1999 (aged 17)	(German Football Association) 1. FC Köln
16	MF	Jannis Kübler	25 May 1999 (aged 16)	(German Football Association) Karlsruher SC
17	FW	Yari Otto	27 May 1999 (aged 16)	(German Football Association) VfL Wolfsburg
18	DF	Davide-Jerome Itter	5 January 1999 (aged 17)	(German Football Association) VfL Wolfsburg

=== Ukraine ===
Head coach: Oleksandr Petrakov

No.	Pos.	Player	Date of birth (age)	Club
1	GK	Vladyslav Kucheruk	14 February 1999 (aged 17)	(Ukrainian Association of Football) Dynamo Kyiv
2	DF	**Valeriy Bondar**	27 February 1999 (aged 17)	(Ukrainian Association of Football) Shakhtar Donetsk
3	DF	Oleksandr Avramenko	22 March 1999 (aged 17)	(Ukrainian Association of Football) Metalist Kharkiv
4	DF	**Denys Popov**	17 February 1999 (aged 17)	(Ukrainian Association of Football) Dynamo Kyiv
5	DF	**Vitalii Mykolenko**	29 May 1999 (aged 16)	(Ukrainian Association of Football) Dynamo Kyiv
6	MF	Maksym Chekh	3 January 1999 (aged 17)	(Ukrainian Association of Football) Shakhtar Donetsk
7	FW	Andriy Kulakov	28 April 1999 (aged 17)	(Ukrainian Association of Football) Metalist Kharkiv
8	FW	Oleksiy Kashchuk	29 June 2000 (aged 15)	(Ukrainian Association of Football) Shakhtar Donetsk
9	MF	Oleksiy Khakhlyov	6 February 1999 (aged 17)	(Ukrainian Association of Football) Dynamo Kyiv
10	FW	Yaroslav Deda	28 May 1999 (aged 16)	(Ukrainian Association of Football) Volyn Lutsk
11	MF	**Serhiy Buletsa**	16 February 1999 (aged 17)	(Ukrainian Association of Football) Dynamo Kyiv
12	GK	**Andriy Lunin**	11 February 1999 (aged 17)	(Ukrainian Association of Football) Dnipro Dnipropetrovsk
16	MF	Mykola Musolitin	21 January 1999 (aged 17)	(Ukrainian Association of Football) Chornomorets Odesa
17	DF	Oleksiy Sich	30 March 1999 (aged 17)	(Ukrainian Association of Football) Karpaty Lviv
18	DF	Tymofiy Sukhar	4 February 1999 (aged 17)	(Ukrainian Association of Football) Dnipro Dnipropetrovsk
19	FW	Denys Yanakov	1 January 1999 (aged 17)	(Ukrainian Association of Football) Dynamo Kyiv
20	FW	Yuriy Kozyrenko	27 November 1999 (aged 16)	(Ukrainian Association of Football) Dynamo Kyiv
21	MF	Vladyslav Naumets	7 March 1999 (aged 17)	(Ukrainian Association of Football) Dynamo Kyiv

== Group C ==
=== Denmark ===
Head coach: Jan Michaelsen

No.	Pos.	Player	Date of birth (age)	Club
1	GK	Oskar Snorre	26 January 1999 (aged 17)	(Danish Football Association) Lyngby
2	DF	Mads Roerslev	24 June 1999 (aged 16)	(Danish Football Association) Copenhagen
3	DF	Niklas Vesterlund	6 June 1999 (aged 16)	(Danish Football Association) Copenhagen
4	DF	Christian Bech	17 May 1999 (aged 16)	(Danish Football Association) AGF
5	DF	Andreas Poulsen	13 October 1999 (aged 16)	(Danish Football Association) Midtjylland
6	MF	Nicklas Strunck Jakobsen	17 August 1999 (aged 16)	(Danish Football Association) Nordsjælland
7	MF	Jeppe Okkels	27 July 1999 (aged 16)	(Danish Football Association) Silkeborg
8	MF	Victor Torp	30 July 1999 (aged 16)	(Danish Football Association) Midtjylland
9	FW	Jens Odgaard	31 March 1999 (aged 17)	(Danish Football Association) Lyngby
10	FW	**Jonas Wind**	7 February 1999 (aged 17)	(Danish Football Association) Copenhagen
11	MF	Carlo Holse	2 June 1999 (aged 16)	(Danish Football Association) Copenhagen
12	MF	Lasse Sørensen	21 October 1999 (aged 16)	(The Football Association) Stoke City
13	DF	Luka Racic	8 May 1999 (aged 16)	(Danish Football Association) Copenhagen
14	FW	Sebastian Buch Jensen	28 January 1999 (aged 17)	(Danish Football Association) Midtjylland
15	MF	**Wessam Abou Ali**	4 January 1999 (aged 17)	(Danish Football Association) AaB
16	GK	Casper Hauervig	3 April 1999 (aged 17)	(Danish Football Association) Brøndby
17	DF	Nicolai Damkjær	2 April 1999 (aged 17)	(Danish Football Association) Midtjylland
18	MF	**Mads Boe Mikkelsen**	11 December 1999 (aged 16)	(Danish Football Association) AGF

=== England ===
Head coach: (Wales) Steve Cooper

No.	Pos.	Player	Date of birth (age)	Club
1	GK	Jared Thompson	23 March 1999 (aged 17)	(The Football Association) Chelsea
2	DF	Dujon Sterling	24 October 1999 (aged 16)	(The Football Association) Chelsea
3	DF	Jaden Brown	24 January 1999 (aged 17)	(The Football Association) Tottenham Hotspur
4	MF	Marcus McGuane	2 February 1999 (aged 17)	(The Football Association) Arsenal
5	DF	**Trevoh Chalobah**	5 July 1999 (aged 16)	(The Football Association) Chelsea
6	MF	Dennis Adeniran	2 January 1999 (aged 17)	(The Football Association) Fulham
7	FW	Ben Morris	6 July 1999 (aged 16)	(The Football Association) Ipswich Town
8	MF	Andre Dozzell	2 May 1999 (aged 17)	(The Football Association) Ipswich Town
9	FW	**George Hirst**	15 February 1999 (aged 17)	(The Football Association) Sheffield Wednesday
10	MF	**Mason Mount**	10 January 1999 (aged 17)	(The Football Association) Chelsea
11	FW	Reiss Nelson	10 December 1999 (aged 16)	(The Football Association) Arsenal
12	DF	Edward Francis	11 September 1999 (aged 16)	(The Football Association) Manchester City
13	GK	Ryan Sandford	21 February 1999 (aged 17)	(The Football Association) Millwall
14	DF	Tolaji Bola	4 January 1999 (aged 17)	(The Football Association) Arsenal
15	MF	Ryan Sessegnon	18 May 2000 (aged 15)	(The Football Association) Fulham
16	FW	Samuel Shashoua	13 May 1999 (aged 16)	(The Football Association) Tottenham Hotspur
17	FW	Joshua Bohui	3 March 1999 (aged 17)	(The Football Association) Brentford
18	DF	Morgan Feeney	8 February 1999 (aged 17)	(The Football Association) Everton
21	GK	Nick Hayes	10 April 1999 (aged 17)	(The Football Association) Ipswich Town

1. Nick Hayes was called up during the tournament due to an injury to Ryan Sandford.

=== France ===
Head coach: Bernard Diomède

No.	Pos.	Player	Date of birth (age)	Club
1	GK	Gaëtan Poussin	13 January 1999 (aged 17)	(French Football Federation) Bordeaux
2	DF	**Yan Valery**	22 February 1999 (aged 17)	(The Football Association) Southampton
3	DF	Malang Sarr	23 January 1999 (aged 17)	(French Football Federation) Nice
4	DF	**Boubacar Kamara**	23 November 1999 (aged 16)	(French Football Federation) Marseille
5	DF	Dan-Axel Zagadou	3 June 1999 (aged 16)	(French Football Federation) Paris Saint-Germain
6	MF	Aurélien Nguiamba	18 January 1999 (aged 17)	(French Football Federation) Nancy
7	FW	Hakim El Mokeddem	15 February 1999 (aged 17)	(French Football Federation) Toulouse
8	MF	Michaël Cuisance	16 August 1999 (aged 16)	(French Football Federation) Nancy
9	FW	Amine Karraoui	9 June 1999 (aged 16)	(French Football Federation) Montpellier
10	MF	**Rafik Guitane**	26 May 1999 (aged 16)	(French Football Federation) Le Havre
11	MF	Antoine Bernède	26 May 1999 (aged 16)	(French Football Federation) Paris Saint-Germain
12	DF	Paul Fargeas	21 March 1999 (aged 17)	(French Football Federation) Toulouse
13	DF	**Loïc Bessilé**	19 February 1999 (aged 17)	(French Football Federation) Toulouse
14	FW	**Yassin Fortune**	30 January 1999 (aged 17)	(The Football Association) Arsenal
15	DF	Mahamadou Dembélé	10 April 1999 (aged 17)	(French Football Federation) Paris Saint-Germain
16	GK	Didier Desprez	13 March 1999 (aged 17)	(French Football Federation) Lens
17	MF	**Raouf Mroivili**	14 January 1999 (aged 17)	(French Football Federation) Marseille
18	FW	Ervin Taha	14 March 1999 (aged 17)	(French Football Federation) Bordeaux

=== Sweden ===
Head coach: Magnus Wikman

No.	Pos.	Player	Date of birth (age)	Club
1	GK	**Pontus Dahlberg**	21 January 1999 (aged 17)	(Swedish Football Association) IFK Göteborg
2	MF	Emre Erdogdu	6 August 1999 (aged 16)	(Swedish Football Association) IF Brommapojkarna
3	DF	Hugo Andersson	1 January 1999 (aged 17)	(Swedish Football Association) Malmö FF
4	DF	Joseph Colley	13 April 1999 (aged 17)	(The Football Association) Chelsea
5	DF	Johan Stenmark	26 February 1999 (aged 17)	(Swedish Football Association) Kalmar FF
6	MF	Henrik Bellman	24 March 1999 (aged 17)	(Danish Football Association) Copenhagen
7	FW	Niclas Holgersson	26 June 1999 (aged 16)	(Swedish Football Association) Ljungskile SK
8	MF	**Mattias Svanberg**	5 January 1999 (aged 17)	(Swedish Football Association) Malmö FF
9	FW	Joel Asoro	27 April 1999 (aged 17)	(The Football Association) Sunderland
10	MF	Nebiyou Perry	2 October 1999 (aged 16)	(Swedish Football Association) AIK
11	MF	Simon Marklund	14 September 1999 (aged 16)	(Swedish Football Association) Åtvidabergs FF
12	GK	Malte Påhlsson	2 June 1999 (aged 16)	(Swedish Football Association) IS Halmia
13	DF	Filip Örnblom	13 March 1999 (aged 17)	(Swedish Football Association) Östers IF
14	FW	Teddy Bergqvist	16 March 1999 (aged 17)	(Swedish Football Association) Malmö FF
15	FW	Adrian Edqvist	20 May 1999 (aged 16)	(Swedish Football Association) Malmö FF
16	DF	Mirad Garza	14 February 1999 (aged 17)	(Swedish Football Association) BK Häcken
17	MF	Oscar Petersson	26 February 1999 (aged 17)	(Swedish Football Association) Malmö FF
18	DF	**Anel Ahmedhodžić**	26 March 1999 (aged 17)	(The Football Association) Nottingham Forest

== Group D ==
=== Italy ===
Head coach: Alessandro Dal Canto

No.	Pos.	Player	Date of birth (age)	Club
1	GK	Alessandro Plizzari	12 March 2000 (aged 16)	(Italian Football Federation) Milan
2	DF	**Raoul Bellanova**	17 May 2000 (aged 15)	(Italian Football Federation) Milan
3	DF	**Luca Pellegrini**	7 March 1999 (aged 17)	(Italian Football Federation) Roma
4	DF	Edoardo Bianchi	30 April 1999 (aged 17)	(Italian Football Federation) Juventus
5	DF	**Alessandro Bastoni**	13 April 1999 (aged 17)	(Italian Football Federation) Atalanta
6	DF	Alessandro Tripaldelli	9 February 1999 (aged 17)	(Italian Football Federation) Juventus
7	DF	Carmine Setola	13 January 1999 (aged 17)	(Italian Football Federation) Cesena
8	MF	Andrea Marcucci	7 February 1999 (aged 17)	(Italian Football Federation) Roma
9	MF	Marco Olivieri	30 June 1999 (aged 16)	(Italian Football Federation) Empoli
10	MF	Matteo Gabbia	21 October 1999 (aged 16)	(Italian Football Federation) Milan
11	MF	Alessio Militari	15 January 1999 (aged 17)	(Italian Football Federation) Fiorentina
12	GK	Gabriel Meli	5 February 1999 (aged 17)	(Italian Football Federation) Empoli
13	MF	**Davide Frattesi**	22 September 1999 (aged 16)	(Italian Football Federation) Roma
14	MF	Alessandro Mallamo	22 March 1999 (aged 17)	(Italian Football Federation) Atalanta
15	MF	Fabrizio Caligara	12 April 2000 (aged 16)	(Italian Football Federation) Juventus
16	FW	**Andrea Pinamonti**	19 May 1999 (aged 16)	(Italian Football Federation) Internazionale
17	FW	**Moise Kean**	28 February 2000 (aged 16)	(Italian Football Federation) Juventus
18	FW	**Gianluca Scamacca**	1 January 1999 (aged 17)	(Royal Dutch Football Association) PSV Eindhoven

=== Netherlands ===
Head coach: Kees van Wonderen

No.	Pos.	Player	Date of birth (age)	Club
1	GK	Mike van de Meulenhof	11 May 1999 (aged 16)	(Royal Dutch Football Association) PSV
2	DF	**Navajo Bakboord**	29 January 1999 (aged 17)	(Royal Dutch Football Association) Ajax
3	DF	**Matthijs de Ligt**	12 August 1999 (aged 16)	(Royal Dutch Football Association) Ajax
4	DF	Pascal Struijk	11 August 1999 (aged 16)	(Royal Dutch Football Association) ADO Den Haag
5	DF	**Owen Wijndal**	28 November 1999 (aged 16)	(Royal Dutch Football Association) AZ
6	MF	Jordy Wehrmann	25 March 1999 (aged 17)	(Royal Dutch Football Association) Feyenoord
7	FW	**Justin Kluivert**	5 May 1999 (aged 17)	(Royal Dutch Football Association) Ajax
8	MF	Leandro Fernandes	25 December 1999 (aged 16)	(Royal Dutch Football Association) PSV
9	FW	**Dylan Vente**	9 May 1999 (aged 16)	(Royal Dutch Football Association) Feyenoord
10	FW	**Donyell Malen**	19 January 1999 (aged 17)	(The Football Association) Arsenal
11	FW	**Tahith Chong**	4 December 1999 (aged 16)	(Royal Dutch Football Association) Feyenoord
12	DF	Boyd Reith	5 May 1999 (aged 17)	(Royal Dutch Football Association) Feyenoord
13	DF	**Jordan Teze**	30 September 1999 (aged 16)	(Royal Dutch Football Association) PSV
14	MF	**Ferdi Kadioglu**	7 October 1999 (aged 16)	(Royal Dutch Football Association) NEC
15	DF	**Tyrell Malacia**	17 August 1999 (aged 16)	(Royal Dutch Football Association) Feyenoord
16	GK	Menno Vink	3 April 1999 (aged 17)	(Royal Dutch Football Association) FC Utrecht
17	FW	Ché Nunnely	4 February 1999 (aged 17)	(Royal Dutch Football Association) Ajax
18	MF	Tom van de Looi	2 July 1999 (aged 16)	(Royal Dutch Football Association) Groningen

=== Serbia ===
Head coach: Ilija Stolica

No.	Pos.	Player	Date of birth (age)	Club
1	GK	Miloš Čupić	24 April 1999 (aged 17)	(Football Association of Serbia) OFK Beograd
2	DF	Julijan Popović	15 June 1999 (aged 16)	(German Football Association) Bayer 04 Leverkusen
3	DF	Mladen Devetak	12 March 1999 (aged 17)	(Football Association of Serbia) Vojvodina
4	MF	Miloš Nikolić	8 April 1999 (aged 17)	(Football Association of Serbia) Red Star
5	DF	Marko Ilić	24 September 1999 (aged 16)	(Football Association of Serbia) OFK Beograd
6	DF	Strahinja Bošnjak	18 February 1999 (aged 17)	(Football Association of Serbia) Partizan
7	FW	Luka Ilić	2 July 1999 (aged 16)	(Football Association of Serbia) Red Star
8	MF	Veljko Nikolić	29 August 1999 (aged 16)	(Football Association of Serbia) OFK Beograd
9	FW	Đorđe Jovanović	15 February 1999 (aged 17)	(Football Association of Serbia) Partizan
10	MF	Igor Maksimović	31 July 1999 (aged 16)	(Football Association of Serbia) Partizan
11	FW	**Dejan Joveljić**	7 August 1999 (aged 16)	(Football Association of Serbia) Red Star
12	GK	**Aleksandar Popović**	27 September 1999 (aged 16)	(Football Association of Serbia) Partizan
13	MF	Lazar Nikolić	1 August 1999 (aged 16)	(Football Association of Serbia) OFK Beograd
14	DF	**Ranko Veselinović**	24 March 1999 (aged 17)	(Football Association of Serbia) Vojvodina
15	DF	**Aleksa Terzić**	17 August 1999 (aged 16)	(Football Association of Serbia) Red Star
16	MF	Armin Đerlek	15 July 2000 (aged 15)	(Football Association of Serbia) OFK Beograd
17	FW	Stefan Ilić	24 September 1999 (aged 16)	(Football Association of Serbia) OFK Beograd
18	MF	Njegoš Petrović	18 July 1999 (aged 16)	(Football Association of Serbia) Rad

=== Spain ===
Head coach: Santiago Denia

No.	Pos.	Player	Date of birth (age)	Club
1	GK	Iñaki Peña	2 March 1999 (aged 17)	(Royal Spanish Football Federation) Barcelona
2	DF	Álex Robles	28 January 1999 (aged 17)	(Royal Spanish Football Federation) Malaga
3	DF	Fran García	14 August 1999 (aged 16)	(Royal Spanish Football Federation) Real Madrid
4	DF	Juan Brandariz	2 March 1999 (aged 17)	(Royal Spanish Football Federation) Barcelona
5	DF	Gorka Zabarte	9 January 1999 (aged 17)	(Royal Spanish Football Federation) Real Madrid
6	MF	Oriol Busquets	20 January 1999 (aged 17)	(Royal Spanish Football Federation) Barcelona
7	FW	Jordi Mboula	16 March 1999 (aged 17)	(Royal Spanish Football Federation) Barcelona
8	MF	Manu Morlanes	12 January 1999 (aged 17)	(Royal Spanish Football Federation) Villarreal
9	FW	**Abel Ruiz**	28 January 2000 (aged 16)	(Royal Spanish Football Federation) Barcelona
10	MF	**Brahim Díaz**	3 August 1999 (aged 16)	(The Football Association) Manchester City
11	FW	Iván Martín	14 February 1999 (aged 17)	(Royal Spanish Football Federation) Roda
12	DF	Alex Ujía	9 June 1999 (aged 16)	(Royal Spanish Football Federation) Real Sociedad
13	GK	Adri López	9 January 1999 (aged 17)	(Royal Spanish Football Federation) Espanyol
14	MF	Martín Calderón	1 March 1999 (aged 17)	(Royal Spanish Football Federation) Real Madrid
15	DF	David Subías	6 March 1999 (aged 17)	(Royal Spanish Football Federation) Real Zaragoza
16	MF	Pol Lozano	6 October 1999 (aged 16)	(Royal Spanish Football Federation) Espanyol
17	FW	Álex Millán	7 November 1999 (aged 16)	(Royal Spanish Football Federation) Real Zaragoza
18	DF	José Carlos Aliaga	18 January 1999 (aged 17)	(Royal Spanish Football Federation) Atlético Madrid
