= 2020 Allsvenskan =

96th season of Allsvenskan

Allsvenskan
- Season: 2020
- Champions: Malmö FF; 24th Allsvenskan title 21st Swedish title
- Relegated: Helsingborgs IF; Falkenbergs FF
- Champions League: Malmö FF
- Europa Conference League: Hammarby IF (CW); IF Elfsborg; BK Häcken
- Matches: 240
- Goals: 674 (2.81 per match)
- Top goalscorer: Christoffer Nyman (18 goals)
- Biggest home win: BK Häcken 6–0 IF Elfsborg (16 July 2020)
- Biggest away win: Mjällby AIF 0–5 IF Elfsborg (23 July 2020)
- Highest scoring: IK Sirius 2–5 Malmö FF (26 July 2020); Örebro SK 4–3 IFK Norrköping (30 August 2020); Varbergs BoIS 5–2 Hammarby IF (10 November 2020); IFK Norrköping 3–4 Helsingborgs IF (6 December 2020)
- Longest winning run: 8 matches Malmö FF
- Longest unbeaten run: 12 matches Malmö FF
- Longest winless run: 14 matches IFK Göteborg
- Longest losing run: 6 matches Kalmar FF; Östersunds FK

The 2020 Allsvenskan (commonly known as CoronAllsvenskan, due to the effects of the COVID-19 pandemic on the 2020 Allsvenskan season), part of the 2020 Swedish football season, was the 96th season of Allsvenskan since its establishment in 1924. A total of 16 teams participated. Djurgårdens IF were the defending champions after winning the title in the previous season.

The 2020 Allsvenskan season was scheduled to begin on 4 April and end on 8 November 2020 (not including play-off matches), but due to the COVID-19 pandemic in Sweden the opening games of the season were delayed. On 4 June 2020, the Swedish government and the Public Health Agency of Sweden announced that the travel restrictions within Sweden were lifted. There were therefore no restrictions that were prohibiting resuming league play in Sweden and the Swedish Football Association announced, also on 4 June 2020, that the 2020 Allsvenskan season would resume on 14 June 2020.

Malmö FF won the Swedish championship this season, their 24th Allsvenskan title and 21st Swedish championship overall, in the 27th round on 8 November 2020 when they won 4–0 against IK Sirius at home.

== Effects of the COVID-19 pandemic ==
The season was scheduled to begin on 4 April, but was postponed indefinitely on 19 March due to the COVID-19 pandemic in Sweden. On 17 April, a target start date of 14 June was established for the competition by chairman of the Swedish Football Association, Karl-Erik Nilsson. It was initially speculated that matches would not be played behind closed doors, as the country had not gone into lockdown like other European countries at the time. The guidelines and rules issued by the Swedish government and the Public Health Agency of Sweden did however prevent a start of the 2020 Allsvenskan, as they advised against all non-essential travel within Sweden, which would limit the possibilities of Allsvenskan teams to travel to the Allsvenskan games. On 4 June 2020, it was announced that the Swedish travel restrictions were lifted and there were therefore no restrictions preventing Allsvenskan to resume play. The Swedish Football Association accordingly announced, also on 4 June 2020, that the 2020 Allsvenskan season would commence on 14 June 2020.

New guidelines regarding league play were issued on 8 June 2020, which detailed that due to the ban on gathering of more than 50 people in Sweden, all games were to be played without any attendance. Other guidelines included that no players with symptoms were allowed to travel or play and that the travel option with the most limited number of social contacts should be used (which means bus travel for the majority of teams).

== Teams ==
Location of teams in 2020 Allsvenskan

A total of sixteen teams are contesting the league, including fourteen sides from the previous season, and two promoted teams from the 2019 Superettan.

GIF Sundsvall and AFC Eskilstuna were relegated at the end of the 2019 season after finishing at the bottom two places of the table, and were replaced by the 2019 Superettan champions Mjällby AIF and runners-up Varbergs BoIS.

=== Stadiums and locations ===
Team	Location	Stadium	Turf	Stadium capacity (Note: According to each club information page at the Swedish Football Association website for Allsvenskan.)
AIK	Solna	Friends Arena	Natural	50,000
BK Häcken	Gothenburg	Bravida Arena	Artificial	6,500
Djurgårdens IF	Stockholm	Tele2 Arena	Artificial	30,000
Falkenbergs FF	Falkenberg	Falcon Alkoholfri Arena	Natural	5,565
Hammarby IF	Stockholm	Tele2 Arena	Artificial	30,000
Helsingborgs IF	Helsingborg	Olympia	Natural	16,500
IF Elfsborg	Borås	Borås Arena	Artificial	16,899
IFK Göteborg	Gothenburg	Gamla Ullevi	Natural	18,600
IFK Norrköping	Norrköping	Nya Parken (Note: Known as Östgötaporten for sponsorship reasons.)	Artificial	15,734
IK Sirius	Uppsala	Studenternas IP	Artificial	10,000
Kalmar FF	Kalmar	Guldfågeln Arena	Natural	12,000
Malmö FF	Malmö	Malmö Nya Stadion (Note: Known as Eleda Stadion for sponsorship reasons.)	Natural	22,500
Mjällby AIF	Hällevik	Strandvallen	Natural	6,750
Varbergs BoIS	Varberg	Påskbergsvallen (Note: Known as Varberg Energi Arena for sponsorship reasons.)	Natural	4,500
Örebro SK	Örebro	Eyravallen (Note: Known as Behrn Arena for sponsorship reasons.)	Artificial	12,300
Östersunds FK	Östersund	Jämtkraft Arena	Artificial	8,466

=== Personnel and kits ===
All teams are obligated to have the logo of the league sponsor Unibet as well as the Allsvenskan logo on the right sleeve of their shirt.

Note: Flags indicate national team as has been defined under FIFA eligibility rules. Players and Managers may hold more than one non-FIFA nationality.

Team	Head coach	Captain	Kit manufacturer	Main shirt sponsor
AIK	(Sweden) Bartosz Grzelak	(Eritrea) Henok Goitom	(United States) Nike	Notar
BK Häcken	(Sweden) Andreas Alm	(Sweden) Rasmus Lindgren	(Germany) Puma	BRA
Djurgårdens IF	(Sweden) Kim Bergstrand (Sweden) Thomas Lagerlöf	(Sweden) Jesper Karlström	(Germany) Adidas	Prioritet Finans
Falkenbergs FF	(Sweden) Hans Eklund	(Sweden) Tibor Joza	(Germany) Adidas	Gekås Ullared
Hammarby IF	(Sweden) Stefan Billborn	(Denmark) Jeppe Andersen	(Sweden) Craft	Jobman
Helsingborgs IF	(Sweden) Olof Mellberg	(Sweden) Andreas Granqvist	(Germany) Puma	Resurs Bank
IF Elfsborg	(Sweden) Jimmy Thelin	(Norway) Sivert Heltne Nilsen	(England) Umbro	Sparbanken Sjuhärad
IFK Göteborg	(Sweden) Roland Nilsson	(Sweden) Robin Söder	(Sweden) Craft	Serneke
IFK Norrköping	(Sweden) Jens Gustafsson	(Sweden) Alexander Fransson	(United States) Nike	Holmen
IK Sirius	(Sweden) Henrik Rydström	(Sweden) Niklas Thor	(Denmark) Select	Various
Kalmar FF	(Sweden) Nanne Bergstrand	(Sweden) Viktor Elm	(Denmark) Select	Hjältevadshus
Malmö FF	(Denmark) Jon Dahl Tomasson	(Denmark) Anders Christiansen	(Germany) Puma	Volkswagen
Mjällby AIF	(Sweden) Marcus Lantz	(Sweden) David Löfquist	(Germany) Puma	Various
Varbergs BoIS	(Sweden) Joakim Persson	(Sweden) Astrit Selmani	(Sweden) Craft	Various
Örebro SK	(Sweden) Axel Kjäll	(Sweden) Nordin Gerzić	(Germany) Puma	ÖBAB
Östersunds FK	(Sweden) Amir Azrafshan	(Guinea) Aly Keita	(Germany) Adidas	Volkswagen

=== Managerial changes ===
Team	Outgoing manager	Manner of departure	Date of vacancy	Table	Incoming manager	Date of appointment
Mjällby AIF	(Serbia) Miloš Milojević	End of contract	1 December 2019	Pre-season	(Sweden) Marcus Lantz	10 December 2019
Malmö FF	(Germany) Uwe Rösler	Mutual consent	13 December 2019	Pre-season	(Denmark) Jon Dahl Tomasson	5 January 2020
Kalmar FF	(Sweden) Jens Nilsson	End of caretaker spell	13 December 2019	Pre-season	(Sweden) Nanne Bergstrand	13 December 2019
Östersunds FK	(England) Ian Burchnall	Mutual consent	11 July 2020	15th	(Sweden) Amir Azrafshan	11 July 2020
AIK	(Sweden) Rikard Norling	Sacked	27 July 2020	12th	(Sweden) Bartosz Grzelak	31 July 2020
IFK Göteborg	(Sweden) Poya Asbaghi	Sacked	3 September 2020	12th	(Sweden) Roland Nilsson	11 September 2020

== League table ==
Pos	Team	Pld	W	D	L	GF	GA	GD	Pts	Qualification or relegation
1	Malmö FF (C)	30	17	9	4	64	30	+34	60	Qualification for the Champions League first qualifying round
2	IF Elfsborg	30	12	15	3	49	38	+11	51	Qualification for the Europa Conference League second qualifying round
3	BK Häcken	30	12	13	5	45	29	+16	49	Qualification for the Europa Conference League second qualifying round
4	Djurgårdens IF	30	14	6	10	48	33	+15	48	
5	Mjällby AIF	30	13	8	9	48	44	+4	47	
6	IFK Norrköping	30	13	7	10	60	46	+14	46	
7	Örebro SK	30	12	6	12	37	41	−4	42	
8	Hammarby IF	30	10	11	9	47	47	0	41	Qualification for the Europa Conference League second qualifying round (Note: Hammarby IF qualified for the Europa Conference League second qualifying round by winning the 2020–21 Svenska Cupen.)
9	AIK	30	10	9	11	30	33	−3	39	
10	IK Sirius	30	9	11	10	43	51	−8	38	
11	Varbergs BoIS	30	10	7	13	45	44	+1	37	
12	IFK Göteborg	30	7	13	10	35	41	−6	34	
13	Östersunds FK	30	8	9	13	27	46	−19	33	
14	Kalmar FF (O)	30	6	10	14	30	49	−19	28	Qualification for the relegation play-offs
15	Helsingborgs IF (R)	30	5	11	14	33	48	−15	26	Relegation to Superettan
16	Falkenbergs FF (R)	30	5	9	16	33	54	−21	24	Relegation to Superettan

Source: svenskfotboll.se (in Swedish)
Rules for classification: 1) Points; 2) Goal difference; 3) Goals scored; 4) Head-to-head points; 5) Head-to-head goal difference; 6) Head-to-head away goals scored; 7) Play-off
(Note: Play-off is only played if need to decide champion, teams for relegation or UEFA competition and will be played on a neutral ground).
(C) Champions; (O) Play-off winners; (R) Relegated

== Positions by round ==
Team ╲ Round	1	2	3	4	5	6	7	8	9	10	11	12	13	14	15	16	17	18	19	20	21	22	23	24	25	26	27	28	29	30
Malmö FF	5	3	4	5	2	7	7	5	2	2	2	2	1	1	1	1	1	1	1	1	1	1	1	1	1	1	1	1	1	1
IF Elfsborg	7	4	5	7	7	5	2	7	3	3	3	3	3	2	2	2	2	3	4	4	4	3	5	5	5	2	2	2	2	2
BK Häcken	8	13	12	6	6	4	8	2	5	4	4	5	5	5	5	5	3	2	2	2	2	5	2	3	4	4	3	4	3	3
Djurgårdens IF	3	8	13	4	11	10	5	3	7	6	5	4	4	4	3	3	4	4	3	3	3	4	4	4	2	3	4	3	5	4
Mjällby AIF	13	14	14	13	10	6	3	6	8	9	9	9	10	8	8	8	8	8	8	10	8	9	8	10	11	9	7	7	6	5
IFK Norrköping	6	1	1	1	1	1	1	1	1	1	1	1	2	3	4	4	5	5	5	5	5	2	3	2	3	5	5	5	4	6
Örebro SK	14	10	11	11	13	13	9	12	10	8	10	10	9	10	10	11	11	11	11	11	11	11	10	11	9	8	10	8	8	7
Hammarby IF	4	2	7	12	9	11	12	10	11	11	8	8	7	6	6	7	7	7	7	7	7	7	7	7	6	6	6	6	7	8
AIK	2	9	3	3	8	8	11	9	9	10	12	11	12	13	14	13	12	13	12	13	12	12	11	9	10	10	8	9	9	9
IK Sirius	12	12	9	10	3	2	4	8	4	5	6	6	6	7	7	6	6	6	6	6	6	6	6	6	7	7	9	10	10	10
Varbergs BoIS	1	7	6	2	5	3	6	4	6	7	7	7	8	9	9	10	10	10	10	8	10	10	12	12	12	12	12	11	11	11
IFK Göteborg	11	11	8	9	4	9	10	11	12	12	11	12	11	11	11	12	13	12	13	12	14	13	13	13	13	13	13	13	13	12
Östersunds FK	15	15	15	15	15	15	13	13	13	13	13	14	14	16	12	9	9	9	9	9	9	8	9	8	8	11	11	12	12	13
Kalmar FF	10	6	2	8	12	12	14	14	15	15	15	16	16	14	13	15	15	15	16	16	15	15	15	16	16	16	14	14	14	14
Helsingborgs IF	16	16	16	16	16	16	16	15	14	14	14	15	15	12	15	16	16	14	14	14	13	14	14	14	14	15	16	16	16	15
Falkenbergs FF	9	5	10	14	14	14	15	16	16	16	16	13	13	15	16	14	14	16	15	15	16	16	16	15	15	14	15	15	15	16

Leader
2021–22 UEFA Europa Conference League Second qualifying round
Relegation play-offs
Relegation to 2021 Superettan

Updated to match(es) played on 6 December 2020. Source: everysport.com

== Results by round ==
Team ╲ Round	1	2	3	4	5	6	7	8	9	10	11	12	13	14	15	16	17	18	19	20	21	22	23	24	25	26	27	28	29	30
AIK	W	L	W	D	L	D	L	W	D	L	L	D	L	L	L	D	W	L	D	W	W	W	W	D	D	W	W	L	L	D
BK Häcken	D	D	D	W	D	W	L	W	D	W	D	L	W	L	W	W	W	W	D	D	L	W	D	D	L	D	W	D	W	D
Djurgårdens IF	W	L	L	W	L	D	W	W	L	D	W	W	W	L	W	W	D	L	D	D	L	D	W	W	W	L	L	W	L	W
Falkenbergs FF	D	W	L	L	L	D	L	L	D	D	D	W	D	L	L	D	L	L	L	W	L	L	L	W	D	W	L	L	D	L
Hammarby IF	W	D	L	L	W	L	D	W	D	L	W	D	D	W	W	D	L	D	W	D	L	W	D	W	W	D	L	D	L	L
Helsingborgs IF	L	L	D	L	L	D	W	D	D	D	D	D	L	W	L	L	L	W	D	D	W	L	L	D	L	L	L	L	D	W
IF Elfsborg	W	D	D	D	D	W	W	L	W	W	D	D	W	W	W	D	L	D	D	D	D	D	L	W	D	W	W	W	D	D
IFK Göteborg	L	W	D	D	W	L	L	D	D	D	D	L	D	D	D	L	D	D	L	W	L	D	W	L	L	L	W	D	W	W
IFK Norrköping	W	W	W	W	D	W	D	W	L	W	D	D	L	L	L	W	L	L	D	W	D	W	L	W	D	L	L	W	W	L
IK Sirius	L	W	D	D	W	W	D	L	W	D	L	D	D	D	W	W	W	L	D	W	L	W	L	L	D	D	L	L	D	L
Kalmar FF	L	W	W	L	L	L	L	L	L	D	D	D	L	W	D	L	L	D	D	L	W	D	L	L	D	D	W	L	W	D
Malmö FF	W	D	D	D	W	L	D	W	W	W	W	W	W	W	W	D	W	D	L	D	D	W	W	L	W	W	W	D	L	W
Mjällby AIF	L	L	D	W	W	W	W	L	L	L	D	D	D	W	L	D	W	D	L	D	W	L	W	L	D	W	W	W	W	W
Varbergs BoIS	W	L	D	W	L	W	L	W	D	L	D	D	L	D	L	L	W	W	W	L	L	D	L	L	D	L	W	W	W	L
Örebro SK	L	W	D	D	D	L	W	L	W	D	L	L	W	D	L	L	L	W	W	D	L	W	W	L	W	W	L	W	L	W
Östersunds FK	L	L	D	L	W	L	W	L	D	D	D	D	D	L	W	W	W	W	D	D	D	W	L	W	L	L	L	L	L	L

Source: Soccerstats.com (in English)
W = Win; D = Draw; L = Lose

== Results ==
Home \ Away	AIK	BKH	DIF	FFF	HAM	HIF	IFE	IFKG	IFKN	IKS	KFF	MFF	MAIF	VAR	ÖSK	ÖFK
AIK	—	0–1	0–1	1–1	3–0	2–0	1–2	2–0	1–4	1–0	0–1	2–2	1–0	1–0	0–2	0–1
BK Häcken	4–0	—	0–2	3–0	3–0	1–0	6–0	0–0	2–1	1–1	0–2	1–1	2–2	2–1	3–0	2–1
Djurgårdens IF	0–1	3–1	—	1–0	1–2	2–2	1–1	2–2	1–2	4–0	5–0	3–2	2–1	1–0	1–2	0–0
Falkenbergs FF	1–1	1–1	3–2	—	1–3	2–2	1–3	0–3	3–3	1–2	0–2	0–1	2–3	2–0	2–1	0–1
Hammarby	0–2	1–1	1–1	1–1	—	2–2	2–2	1–1	0–1	0–0	3–3	2–2	4–2	1–0	3–0	2–0
Helsingborgs IF	2–0	0–0	3–1	0–0	1–1	—	0–0	0–1	3–2	1–2	1–1	0–1	0–1	0–3	1–1	0–1
IF Elfsborg	2–2	1–1	1–0	4–2	2–2	2–1	—	0–0	2–1	3–3	3–1	1–0	2–2	3–3	1–1	0–1
IFK Göteborg	1–0	1–1	1–2	2–2	0–4	1–1	0–1	—	1–3	2–0	1–2	0–3	2–2	1–0	0–1	2–2
IFK Norrköping	2–2	0–1	3–0	4–1	1–2	3–4	1–1	3–1	—	1–2	2–1	1–1	1–1	2–0	2–0	2–2
IK Sirius	0–0	2–2	0–2	2–1	3–1	3–1	1–1	2–2	4–2	—	2–2	2–5	0–1	3–3	2–1	2–3
Kalmar FF	0–0	0–0	0–3	0–0	1–2	4–0	1–2	1–1	0–2	1–1	—	0–4	1–4	1–1	0–3	1–2
Malmö FF	0–0	3–0	1–0	2–1	3–0	4–1	1–1	3–1	1–1	4–0	2–1	—	2–0	2–2	2–1	4–0
Mjällby AIF	3–1	3–1	2–1	0–1	2–1	3–2	0–5	1–1	2–0	1–1	2–2	2–2	—	2–3	1–0	3–0
Varbergs BoIS	2–2	1–3	1–2	3–1	5–2	1–3	0–0	1–2	1–3	2–0	1–0	3–2	1–0	—	2–1	1–1
Örebro SK	0–2	0–0	0–3	1–2	2–1	3–2	3–2	1–1	4–3	2–1	0–1	3–2	3–1	1–0	—	0–0
Östersunds FK	1–2	2–2	1–1	2–1	1–3	0–0	0–1	0–4	2–4	0–2	2–0	1–2	0–1	0–4	0–0	—

Source: Swedish Football Association (in Swedish)
Legend: Blue = home team win; Yellow = draw; Red = away team win.
For upcoming matches, an "a" indicates there is an article about the rivalry between the two participants.

== Relegation play-offs ==
The 14th-placed team of Allsvenskan met the third-placed team from 2020 Superettan in a two-legged tie on a home-and-away basis with the team from Allsvenskan finishing at home.

9 December 2020
18:00

Jönköpings Södra IF	1–3	Kalmar FF
Lowe 3'	Report	Lowe 11' (o.g.); Ring 19'; Herrem 55'

Stadsparksvallen, Jönköping
Referee: Mohammed Al-Hakim

13 December 2020
13:00

Kalmar FF	1–0	Jönköpings Södra IF
Fröling 80'	Report

Guldfågeln Arena, Kalmar
Referee: Glenn Nyberg

Kalmar FF won 4–1 on aggregate.

== Season statistics ==
=== Top scorers ===
As of 6 December 2020

Rank	Player	Club	Goals
1	(Sweden) Christoffer Nyman	IFK Norrköping	18
2	(Sweden) Astrit Selmani	Varbergs BoIS	15
3	(Sweden) Isaac Kiese Thelin	Malmö FF	14
3	(Nigeria) Moses Ogbu	Mjällby AIF	14
5	(Denmark) Anders Christiansen	Malmö FF	13
6	(Sweden) Nahir Besara	Örebro SK	12
6	(United States) Aron Jóhannsson	Hammarby IF	12
6	(Sweden) Stefano Vecchia	IK Sirius	12

=== Top assists ===
As of 6 December 2020

Rank	Player	Club	Assists
1	(Montenegro) Sead Hakšabanović	IFK Norrköping	11
1	(Sweden) Gustav Ludwigson	Hammarby IF	11
3	(Iceland) Ísak Bergmann Jóhannesson	IFK Norrköping	9
3	(Sweden) Alexander Kačaniklić	Hammarby IF	9
5	(Sweden) Johan Larsson	IF Elfsborg	8
6	(Norway) Jo Inge Berget	Malmö FF	7
6	(Sweden) Axel Björnström	IK Sirius	7
6	(Sweden) Sebastian Larsson	AIK	7
6	(Bosnia and Herzegovina) Haris Radetinac	Djurgårdens IF	7
6	(Sweden) Tobias Sana	IFK Göteborg	7

=== Hat-tricks ===
Player	For	Against	Result	Date
(Norway) Fredrik Ulvestad	Djurgårdens IF	Kalmar FF	5–0	28 June 2020
(Turkey) Deniz Hümmet	Örebro SK	IFK Norrköping	4–3	30 August 2020
(Sweden) Muamer Tanković	Hammarby IF	IFK Göteborg	4–0	10 September 2020
(Sweden) Jonathan Levi	IFK Norrköping	Varbergs BoIS	3–1	18 October 2020
(Sweden) Astrit Selmani	Varbergs BoIS	Hammarby IF	5–2	8 November 2020
(Sweden) Christoffer Nyman	IFK Norrköping	Falkenbergs FF	4–1	23 November 2020

=== Discipline ===
==== Player ====
- Most yellow cards: 10
  - (Sweden) Jesper Karlström (Djurgården)
- Most red cards: 3
  - (Sweden) Simon Strand (Elfsborg)

==== Club ====
- Most yellow cards: 49
  - Hammarby IF
- Most red cards: 5
  - IF Elfsborg

== Awards ==
=== Annual awards ===
Award	Winner	Club
Player of the Year	(Denmark) Anders Christiansen	Malmö FF
Goalkeeper of the Year	(Sweden) Oscar Jansson	Örebro SK
Defender of the Year	(Bosnia and Herzegovina) Anel Ahmedhodzic	Malmö FF
Midfielder of the Year	(Denmark) Anders Christiansen	Malmö FF
Striker of the Year	(Sweden) Jesper Karlsson	IF Elfsborg
Breakthrough of the Year	(Bosnia and Herzegovina) Anel Ahmedhodzic	Malmö FF
Coach of the Year	(Denmark) Jon Dahl Tomasson	Malmö FF

== See also ==
Competitions

- 2020 Superettan
- 2020 Division 1
- 2019–20 Svenska Cupen
- 2020–21 Svenska Cupen

Team seasons

- 2020 Hammarby IF season
- 2020 Malmö FF season
