= Amir Azrafshan =

Swedish Iranian football manager

Personal information
- Full name: Amir Azrafshan
- Date of birth: 17 August 1987 (age 39)
- Position: Defender

Team information
- Current team: Dalkurd FF (manager)

Senior career*
Years	Team	Apps	(Gls)
2008–2009	Dalkurd FF	11	(0)
2009	Korsnäs IF FK	9	(2)
2010	Falu FK	10	(3)
2011	Skultorps IF	16	(0)
2012	Dalkurd FF	3	(0)
2012–2014	Falu FK	33	(1)
2015	Hofors AIF	9	(1)
2015	IF Tunabro	3	(0)
2017–2018	Forssa BK	7	(2)
2018	Långholmen FC	3	(1)

Managerial career
- 2013–2014: Falu FK (player-manager)
- 2015: IF Tunabro (player-manager)
- 2015–2017: Dalkurd FF U21
- 2017–2018: Dalkurd FF (assistant)
- 2019–2020: FC Djursholm
- 2020–2021: Östersunds FK
- 2022: Östersunds FK (assistant)
- 2022–: Dalkurd FF
- * Club domestic league appearances and goals

Amir Azrafshan (born 17 August 1987) is a Swedish football manager who is currently managing Dalkurd FF.

== Early life ==
Azrafshan emigrated to Falun at the age of 10.

== Managerial career ==
=== Östersund ===
Azrafshan was appointed as manager of Swedish Allsvenskan side Östersund on 11 July 2020 during the 2020 Allsvenskan season after Englishman Ian Burchnall.

=== Dalkurd ===
Azrafshan was appointed as manager of Superettan side Dalkurd FF in June 2022 during the 2022 Superettan season.
