= Jannis Kübler =

German footballer

Personal information
- Date of birth: 25 May 1999 (age 27)
- Place of birth: Karlsruhe, Germany
- Height: 1.75 m (5 ft 9 in)
- Position: Midfielder

Team information
- Current team: FV Fortuna Kirchfeld

Youth career
- 2004–2008: FV Leopoldshafen
- 2008–2016: Karlsruher SC
- 2016–2018: Schalke 04

Senior career*
Years	Team	Apps	(Gls)
2018–2019	Schalke 04 II	11	(2)
2019–2020	Carl Zeiss Jena	39	(1)
2020–2021	SV Straelen	27	(4)
2021–2022	Wuppertaler SV	23	(0)
2022–	FV Fortuna Kirchfeld		

International career^{‡}
2014	Germany U15	2	(0)
2014–2015	Germany U16	8	(0)
2015–2016	Germany U17	11	(0)
2017–2018	Germany U19	4	(0)
- * Club domestic league appearances and goals as of 4 July 2020 ‡ National team caps and goals as of 15:10, 26 January 2019 (UTC)

Jannis Kübler (born 25 May 1999) is a German footballer who plays as a midfielder for an amateur side FV Fortuna Kirchfeld.

== Club career ==
Kübler made his professional debut for Carl Zeiss Jena in the 3. Liga on 26 January 2019, starting in the home match against Preußen Münster, which finished as a 0–0 draw.

== International career ==
Kübler was included in Germany's squad for the 2016 UEFA European Under-17 Championship in Azerbaijan. The team managed to reach the semi-finals, before losing 1–2 against Spain.
