= Johan Stenmark =

Swedish footballer

Personal information
- Full name: Johan Fredrik Niklas Stenmark
- Date of birth: 26 February 1999 (age 27)
- Place of birth: Sweden
- Position: Centre-back

Youth career
- Kalmar Södra IF
- Kalmar FF

Senior career*
Years	Team	Apps	(Gls)
2018–2022	Kalmar FF	37	(1)
2023–2024	Trelleborgs FF	9	(0)

International career
2014–2016	Sweden U17	23	(0)
2016–2018	Sweden U19	5	(0)
2019	Sweden U21	2	(0)
- * Club domestic league appearances and goals as of 17 November 2023

Johan Stenmark (born 26 February 1999) is a Swedish footballer.

== Career ==
Stenmark began his youth career at Kalmar Södra IF, but left the club during his junior years to join Kalmar FF. In April 2018, he signed a three-year senior contract with Kalmar FF and made his Allsvenskan debut in September the same year in a 0–4 defeat against Malmö FF. In January 2021, he extended his contract with the club.

In January 2023, Stenmark joined Trelleborgs FF on a two-year deal. e left the club following the 2024 season, having missed the entire year due to injury.
