= Leonardo Zottele =

Austrian association football player (1999-)

Personal information
- Full name: Leonardo Mattheo Zottele
- Date of birth: 16 April 1999 (age 27)
- Place of birth: Bludenz, Austria
- Height: 1.85 m (6 ft 1 in)
- Position: Centre-back

Youth career
- 2007–2013: FC Klostertal
- 2013–2015: AKA Vorarlberg
- 2015–2018: 1. FC Nürnberg

Senior career*
Years	Team	Apps	(Gls)
2018–2021	Rheindorf Altach II	12	(2)
2020	→ Dornbirn (loan)	5	(0)

International career
2014–2015	Austria U16	11	(2)
2015–2016	Austria U17	3	(0)
2017	Austria U18	1	(0)
2017–2018	Austria U19	5	(0)
- * Club domestic league appearances and goals as of 14:44, 30 August 2021 (UTC)

Leonardo Mattheo Zottele (born 16 April 1999) is an Austrian footballer who plays as a centre-back.

== Career ==
=== Club career ===
Zottele started his career at FC Klostertal. Ahead of the 2013/14 season he moved to AKA Vorarlberg. After two seasons at the academy os Vorarlberg, 16-year old Zottele moved to Germany in the 2015/16 season to join the youth team at 1. FC Nürnberg.

For the 2018/19 season he returned to Austria and joined Austrian Bundesliga club SC Rheindorf Altach, signing a deal until June 2021. At Altach, however, he was used only used on the clubs reserve team. In January 2020, he was loaned out to FC Dornbirn 1913 until the end of the season. He made his debut for Dornbirn in the 2nd division in February 2020 when he started against SC Austria Lustenau on the 17th matchday of the 2019/20 season. In August 2020, the deal was extended by one season. However, he suffered a concussion in September 2020 and didn't make a single appearance for Dornbirn until the winter break. In January 2021, Zottele finally returned to Altach, after the loan deal was cut short. After the 2020/21 season, he left Altach.
