= Fatawu Safiu =

Ghanaian footballer (born 1994)

Personal information
- Full name: Abdul Fatawu Safiu
- Date of birth: July 16, 1994 (age 32)
- Place of birth: Techiman, Ghana
- Height: 1.76 m (5 ft 9 in)
- Position: Forward

Team information
- Current team: Trollhättan
- Number: 49

Senior career*
Years	Team	Apps	(Gls)
2012–2013	Liberty Professionals	2	(0)
2013–2017	International Allies	10	(5)
2013	→ Vimmerby IF (loan)	20	(7)
2015	→ Portland Timbers 2 (loan)	23	(7)
2016	→ Whitecaps FC 2 (loan)	24	(4)
2017	→ Shirak (loan)	7	(0)
2018	Eleven Wonders	4	(2)
2018–2019	Asante Kotoko	14	(10)
2019–2021	Trelleborgs FF	49	(10)
2021–	Trollhättan	14	(1)

International career^{‡}
2019–	Ghana	1	(0)
- * Club domestic league appearances and goals as of 20 November 2021 ‡ National team caps and goals as of 11 June 2019

Abdul Fatawu Safiu (born July 16, 1994) is a Ghanaian professional footballer who plays as a striker for Swedish club Trollhättan.

== Club career ==
=== Early career ===
Safiu began his career with Liberty Professionals, before moving to International Allies in 2013. He had loan spells with Swedish side Vimmerby IF in 2013, and American United Soccer League side Portland Timbers 2 in 2015 and Whitecaps FC 2 in 2016.

=== Inter Allies ===
In 2014, after returning from his loan with Vimmerby IF. He came back to play the second round of the 2013–14 Ghana Premier League. He played 14 matches in all competitions, scored 7 goals and made 4 assists, in the process he helping them to avoid relegation and place 6th on the league table. He also led them to their first Ghanaian FA Cup final after scoring the only goal in the semi-final against Feyenoord. They however lost in the finals to Kumasi Asante Kotoko.

=== FC Shirak ===
In February 2017, Safiu signed a six-month loan deal with FC Shirak, leaving on 9 June 2017. In his short loan spell won his first professional trophy after FC Shirak scored Pyunik 3–0 in the final to win the 2016–17 Armenian Cup.

=== Eleven Wonders ===
In April 2018, Safiu joined for his hometown club Techiman Eleven Wonders as a free agent ahead of their maiden Ghana Premier League campaign. He signed a one-year deal with the newly promoted side. On his debut match on 6 May 2018 against Cape Coast Ebusua Dwarfs, he scored in the 35th minute and proved an assist to veteran striker Alex Asamoah's goal to give them a 2–0 win. In his short stint with the club, he played 4 matches and scored 2 goals, with the other goal coming on 30 May 2018, in a 2–0 victory over Berekum Chelsea.

=== Asante Kotoko ===
Safiu joined Kumasi Asante Kotoko in November 2018, ahead of the 2018–19 CAF Confederation Cup campaign. He was registered and named on the club's official squad list for the CAF tournament. Even though they were eliminated at the group stages, he was one of their standout performers as he scored 3 goals in 10 matches, as Asante Kotoko reached the group stages of the tournament for the first time in 11 years. In the league, Safiu scored 10 goals to end up joint top goal scorer (tied with Diawisie Taylor) and help Kotoko clinch the 2019 GFA Normalization Committee Special Competition. At the end of the season, he was adjudged the Ghana Football Awards Home-Based player of the year reflecting the impact he made. He beat off competition from his teammate Felix Annan and Accra Hearts of Oak defender Mohammed Alhassan to win the award.

=== Trelleborgs FF ===
On 13 August 2019, Swedish club Trelleborg announced the acquisition Safiu on a permanent deal for the remainder of the 2019 season with an option to extend the deal for a further two years. Prior to signing for Superettan side Trelleborgs FF, he went on a two weeks trial fellow Swedish club Helsinborg IF but a deal was not reached after both parties couldn't settle on a transfer price. On 26 July 2020, Safiu scored his first career hat-trick after striking thrice in Trelleborgs’ 4–1 defeat of Dalkurd FF in a Superettan match. He scored the first in the 12th minute and scored two quickfire goals in the 41st and 43rd minute to complete a first-half hat-trick. The goals ensured that he ended his eight-month goal drought after scoring against Jönköpings Södra IF on 3 November 2019.

=== Trollhättan ===
On 11 August 2021, Safiu moved to Trollhättan in the Swedish third-tier Ettan Södra.

== International career ==
Safiu was called up to the Ghana national football team by Kwesi Appiah in June 2019 ahead of a Pre-AFCON friendly match against Namibia. On 10 June 2019, he made his debut after he was named on the starting line up for the game, which ended in a 1–0 to their Namibian counterparts.

== Personal life ==
On 5 January 2019, Safiu married his girlfriend, Adila Jafar, during an Islamic ceremony in the Encom Hotel in his hometown Techiman.

== Honours ==
Shirak

- Armenian Cup: 2016–17

Asante Kotoko

- GFA Special Competition: 2019

Individual

- GFA Special Competition Top Goal Scorer: 2019
- Ghana Football Awards Home-Based player of the year: 2019
