= Lisa Moazzeni =

Swedish footballer

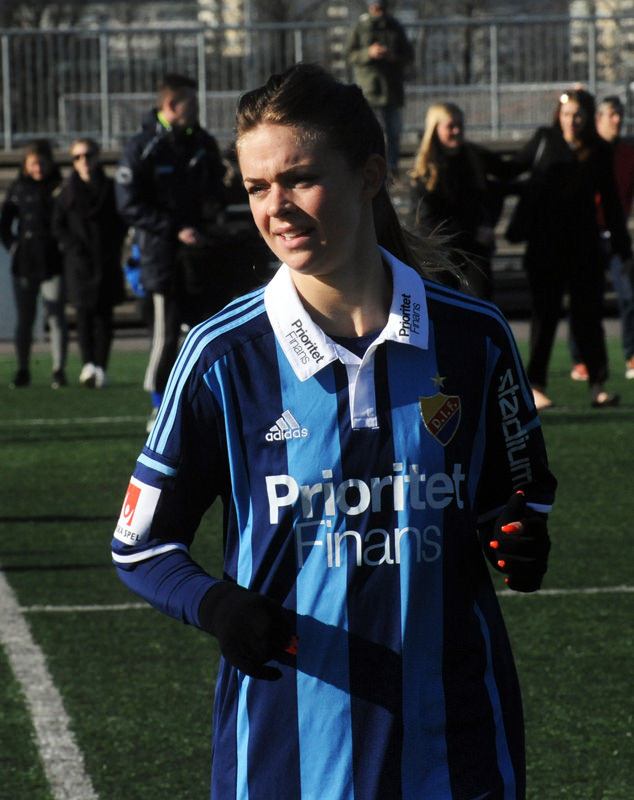
- Lisa Moazzeni in 2015.

Personal information
- Date of birth: 5 February 1992 (age 34)
- Place of birth: Sweden
- Position: Defender

Youth career
- Lindsdals IF

Senior career*
Years	Team	Apps	(Gls)
2011	IFK Kalmar	11	(0)
2011–2012	Kristianstad	3	(0)
2013–2014	AIK	37	(1)
2015–2017	Djurgården	31	(0)
2018	AIK		
- * Club domestic league appearances and goals as of 7 September 2016

Lisa Petersson Moazzeni (born 5 February 1992) is a Swedish football defender who played for Djurgårdens IF. She has played Damallsvenskan football for Kristianstads DFF and AIK.
