= Alessio Militari =

Italian footballer (born 1999)

Personal information
- Date of birth: 15 January 1999 (age 27)
- Place of birth: Rome, Italy
- Height: 1.82 m (6 ft 0 in)
- Position: Midfielder

Youth career
- –2017: Fiorentina

Senior career*
Years	Team	Apps	(Gls)
2017–2018	Cesena	0	(0)
2018–2020	Bologna	0	(0)
2019–2020	→ Renate (loan)	17	(0)
2020–2021	Mantova	28	(0)
2021–2022	Mantova	15	(0)

International career^{‡}
2015–2016	Italy U17	6	(0)
- * Club domestic league appearances and goals as of 24 April 2022 ‡ National team caps and goals as of 3 July 2018

Alessio Militari (born 15 January 1999) is an Italian football player who plays as midfielder.

== Club career ==
=== Cesena ===
On 7 August 2017, Militari made his professional debut against Serie C club Sambenedettese in Coppa Italia.

=== Bologna ===
On 26 July 2018, Militari signed with Serie A club Bologna for free.

==== Loan to Renate ====
On 18 July 2019, he joined Renate on loan.

=== Mantova ===
On 1 September 2020 he moved to Mantova. He left the club at the end of the 2020–21 season as his contract expired. After not playing in the first half of the 2021–22 season, on 9 December 2021 he returned to Mantova.
