= Malte Påhlsson =

Swedish footballer

Personal information
- Full name: Uno Malte Valentin Påhlsson
- Date of birth: 2 June 1999 (age 27)
- Height: 1.83 m (6 ft 0 in)
- Position: Goalkeeper

Team information
- Current team: Trelleborgs FF
- Number: 1

Youth career
- –2012: Alets IK
- 2013–2015: IS Halmia

Senior career*
Years	Team	Apps	(Gls)
2015–2018	IS Halmia	65	(0)
2019–2023	Halmstads BK	8	(0)
2024–2025	Örebro SK	41	(0)
2026–	Trelleborgs FF	28	(0)

International career^{‡}
2014	Sweden U15	1	(0)
2015	Sweden U16	3	(0)
2016	Sweden U17	1	(0)
2017	Sweden U18	1	(0)
- * Club domestic league appearances and goals as of 16 November 2026 ‡ National team caps and goals as of 13 October 2024

Malte Påhlsson (born 2 June 1999) is a Swedish professional footballer who plays for Trelleborgs FF.

He started out as a child in Alets IK, joining IS Halmia in 2013. He made his senior debut for IS Halmia in the 2015 Division 1, playing once that season, then played a majority of the games for Halmia in the Division 2 in 2016, 2017 and 2018. Receiving 6 youth caps for Sweden, Påhlsson was a squad member for the 2016 UEFA European Under-17 Championship.

Ahead of the 2019 season, he moved up two divisions to join the largest team in the city, then-Superettan club Halmstads BK. It was said to be the first direct transfer from Halmia to rivals Halmstad since 1977.

Påhlsson made his Superettan debut on 27 August 2019 and his Allsvenskan debut on 28 August 2021, but both were one-off appearances for the time being. In 1021, Påhlsson also won the Allsvenskan U21 championship. The championship was decided through a penalty shootout, where Påhlsson was the one to convert the decisive penalty.

In the 2023 Allsvenskan, Påhlsson got the chance in several games after Malkolm Nilsson Säfqvist was sidelined due to mental problems. After the 2023 season, though, Påhlsson was not interested in prolonging his contract. He sought more playing time elsewhere. Påhlsson chose Superettan club Örebro SK, where he became the undisputed starter in 2024. The local newspaper praised Påhlsson for "playing with a newly found confidence". Wrote a commentator in Sydnärkenytt, "Without him, ÖSK would have languished in a relegation spot". Still, the commentator criticized Påhlsson for feigning several injuries to waste time for the opposing team, throughout the season.

On 14 December 2025, it was announced that from 2026, Påhlsson would join Trelleborgs FF on a contract.
