= Victor Fors =

Swedish-Eritrean footballer (born 1999)

Personal information
- Full name: Lars Victor Fors
- Date of birth: 11 March 1999 (age 27)
- Height: 1.81 m (5 ft 11 in)
- Position: Right-back

Team information
- Current team: Kongsvinger
- Number: 2

Youth career
- –2016: IF Brommapojkarna

Senior career*
Years	Team	Apps	(Gls)
2017	IF Brommapojkarna	5	(0)
2018	IK Frej	6	(0)
2018	Assyriska FF	4	(0)
2019	IFK Stocksund	23	(0)
2020	IFK Haninge	25	(0)
2021–2023	AFC Eskilstuna	49	(1)
2024–2025	Raufoss	54	(0)
2026–	Kongsvinger	9	(0)

International career^{‡}
2015	Sweden U16	2	(0)
2017	Sweden U18	2	(0)
2018	Sweden U19	6	(0)
2026–	Eritrea	5	(0)
- * Club domestic league appearances and goals as of 2 June 2026 ‡ National team caps and goals as of 16 November 2026

Victor Fors (born 11 March 1999) is a footballer who plays as a right-back for Kongsvinger. Born in Sweden, he represents Eritrea internationally.

== Career ==
Fors came up in the academy of IF Brommapojkarna and made his first-team debut in 2017, the year they won the 2017 Superettan. He made two appearances for the Swedish futures team in 2015, followed by eeight appearances for Sweden U18 and U19 in 2017–2018. From 2018 through 2020 he represented several clubs on the second, third and fourth tier around the Stockholm area: IK Frej, Assyriska FF, IFK Stocksund and IFK Haninge. While he played in lower divisions in Stockholm, he worked on a garbage truck.

Fors returned to the Superettan after three years' absence, when signing for AFC Eskilstuna ahead of the 2021 season. He eventually served as team captain, but missed the entire 2023 season to a damaged cruciate ligament. After AFC Eskilstuna faced relegation to the third tier, Fors left and signed for Raufoss IL in Norway. Reports also claimed he had been followed by Västerås SK.

After two years in Raufoss, his contract was not renewed and he was picked up by a team in the same division, Kongsvinger IL.

In 2026 he was also called up to play for Eritrea, alongside other members of the diaspora. Fors stated that he grew up in "a little Eritrea" in Stockholm. He made his international debut in March in a two-legged face-off against Eswatini, where Eritrea won both legs.
