= Mattias Håkansson =

Swedish footballer

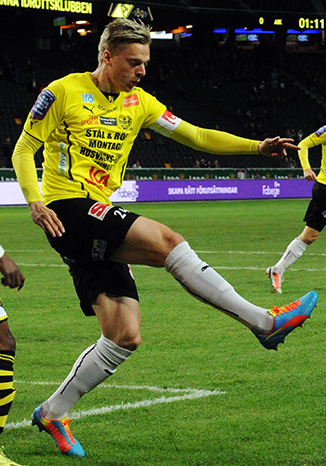

Personal information
- Full name: Mattias Bo-Erik Håkansson
- Date of birth: 20 February 1993 (age 33)
- Place of birth: Sweden
- Height: 1.85 m (6 ft 1 in)
- Position: Midfielder

Team information
- Current team: Levanger

Youth career
- Asarums IF

Senior career*
Years	Team	Apps	(Gls)
2012–2015	Mjällby AIF	73	(5)
2016–2021	Trelleborgs FF	126	(14)
2022–	Levanger	0	(0)
- * Club domestic league appearances and goals as of 27 November 2021

Mattias Bo-Erik Håkansson (born 20 February 1993) is a Swedish footballer who plays for Norwegian club Levanger as a midfielder.

== Club career ==
In March 2022, Håkansson joined Levanger in the Norwegian third-tier Norwegian Second Division.
