= Alexander Nilsson (footballer, born 1990) =

Swedish association football player

Personal information
- Full name: Alexander Daniel Ottar Nilsson
- Date of birth: 11 December 1990 (age 35)
- Place of birth: Malmö, Sweden
- Height: 1.80 m (5 ft 11 in)
- Position: Attacking midfielder

Youth career
- IFK Vaxholm

Senior career*
Years	Team	Apps	(Gls)
2009–2011	Vallentuna BK	?	(?)
2011–2012	IK Frej	25	(6)
2013–2015	Assyriska FF	42	(7)
2016–2017	IK Sirius	51	(9)
2018–2019	IF Brommapojkarna	40	(7)
- * Club domestic league appearances and goals as of 30 May 2018

Alexander Nilsson (born 11 December 1990) is a Swedish footballer who most recently played for IF Brommapojkarna in Allsvenskan.
