= Stadsparksvallen =

Sports ground in Jönköping, Sweden

- Vallen (The Pasture)
- Interactive map of Stadsparksvallen
- Full name: Stadsparksvallen
- Location: Skjutsarbacken 12; SE-553 13 Jönköping, Sweden
- Coordinates: 57°46′59.88″N 14°08′30.71″E
- Owner: Jönköping Municipality
- Capacity: 7,300
- Surface: Grass
- Scoreboard: Yes
- Record attendance: 18,582 (Jönköpings Södra IF vs. Malmö FF, final match of the 1949–50 Allsvenskan season)
- Field size: 105 x 65 m

Construction
- Built: 1902
- Opened: 1902

Tenant
- Jönköpings Södra IF (Ettan)

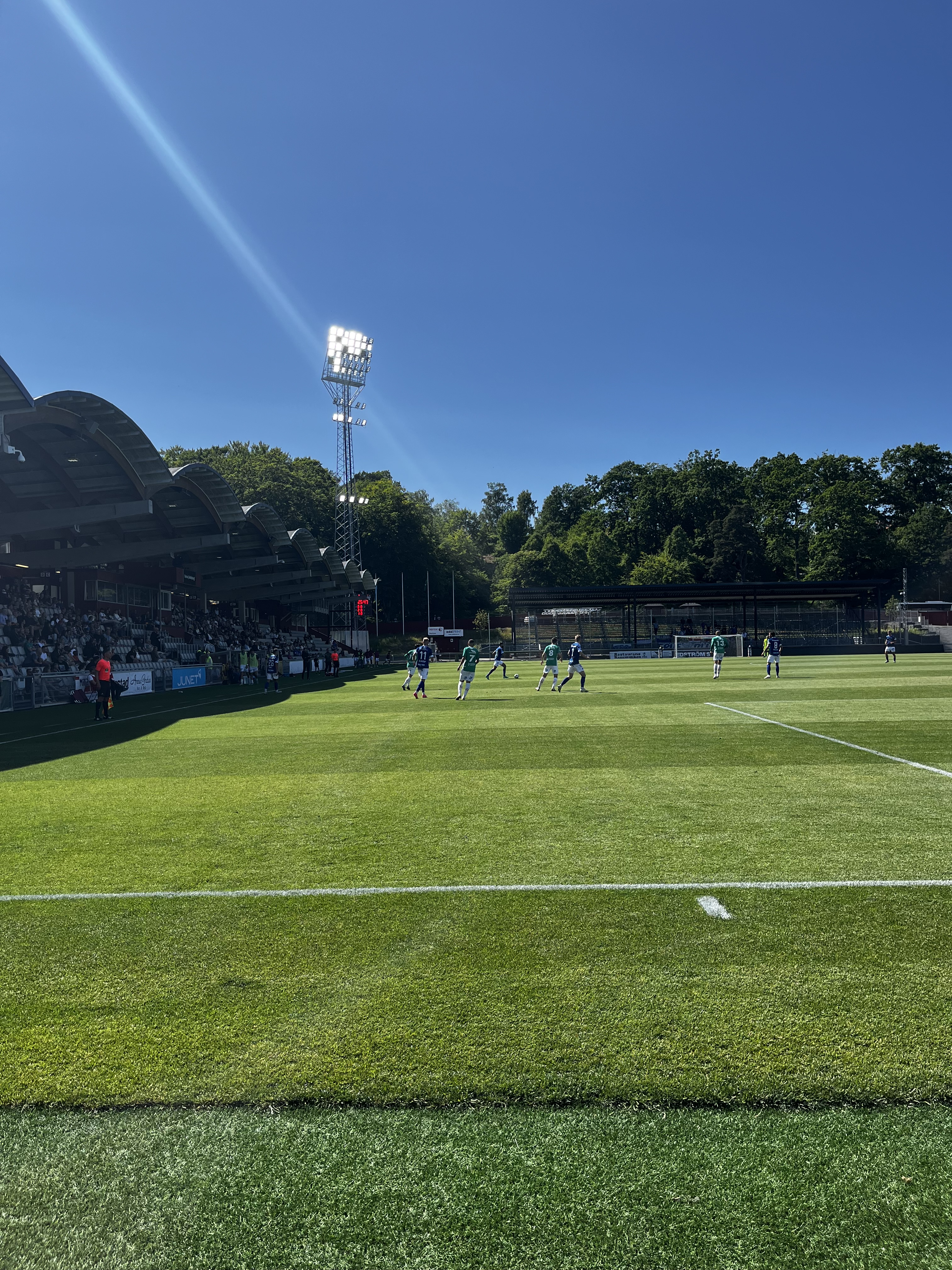
Jsödra against Trelleborg, Superettan 10th of June 2023.

Stadsparksvallen, locally sometimes called Vallen, is a classic sports facility located in Jönköping, Sweden.

Stadsparksvallen was inaugurated in 1902 and is located in the Jönköping City Park, atop a mountain located west of the city. It functions as home ground for football club Jönköpings Södra IF IK Tord has also played its home games here during som seasons. Until 1981 it was also used for track and field events. Jönköpings Södra IF has played 10 seasons in the Swedish Allsvenskan in Stadsparksvallen. Sweden women's national football team has played thrice at the venue, first time in 1985 against Belgium.

During the Swedish Sports Confederation's 100th anniversary in 2003, Stadsparksvallen was designated as one of the 100 sports historic places in Sweden.

== Facts ==
- Dimensions: 115 x 71 yards (105 x 65 meters)
- Capacity: 7,300, of which 3,739 are seated under roof
- Record attendance: 18,582, Jönköpings Södra IF vs. Malmö FF, final match during season 1949–50 in Allsvenskan
