= Dalkurd FF =

Swedish football club

Dalkurd
- Full name: Dalkurd Fotbollsförening
- Founded: 26 September 2004; 22 years ago
- Dissolved: 28 September 2026; 46 days ago
- Ground: Lötens IP
- Capacity: 10,000
- Website: dalkurd.se
Home colours	Away colours

Dalkurd Fotbollsförening, commonly known as Dalkurd FF or simply Dalkurd (Swedish pronunciation: [ˈdɑ̂ːlkɵrd]) was a Swedish football club based in Uppsala. On 26 September 2004, the club was founded by members of the Kurdish diaspora in Borlänge, Dalarna.

In March 2025, Dalkurd paused all operations, due to a severe financial crisis. In September 2026, the club declared bankruptcy.

Dalkurd FF holds the record for the lowest average attendances in the history of both Allsvenskan and Superettan, the two highest Swedish leagues. Dalkurd FF was affiliated with Upplands Fotbollförbund.

== History ==
The club was formed in Borlänge in 2004 by a group of Kurds. It started as a social project to contribute to the youth of Borlänge by offering activities for them. IK Brage helped financing the project. In the first season the squad consisted of an average age of 17 years. Besides contributing to the youngsters, the chairman, Ramazan Kizil, had high expectations of the football players and an ultimate goal: he wanted to take Dalkurd to the professional levels of the Swedish league. Dalkurd won every division they participated in from their very first season in 2005 to 2009. Owing to this uncommon success they got a lot of media attention, both in Sweden and abroad.

The club narrowly avoided catastrophe when travelling home from Spain in March 2015. The club had initially intended to fly from Barcelona to Düsseldorf on Germanwings Flight 9525, but changed its booking at the last minute when they decided the layover in Germany would be too long. Flight 4U 9525 crashed into the French Alps on 24 March, killing everyone on board.

In October 2017, Dalkurd was promoted to the 2018 Allsvenskan On 24 November 2017, Dalkurd chose to move their senior team operations to Uppsala, some 140 kilometers southeast of Borlänge, to play at the new ground Nya Studenternas IP following its opening in 2020. In the 2018 season, however, Dalkurd played their home games at Gavlevallen in Gävle, some 110 kilometers north of Uppsala (and roughly 110 kilometers east of Borlänge).

=== Financial problems and bankruptcy ===
The Dalkurd idrottsaktiebolag DK Elit was declared bankrupt in August 2024, which made the team being demoted one level at the end of the season; having already been relegated from Division 2 the team ended up in Division 4 for the 2025 season. Upplands Fotbollförbund later decided to exclude Dalkurd from Division 4 before the season began. The club then decided to pause all of its activity in March 2025, before being declared bankrupt by the Uppsala District Court on 28 September 2026.

=== Season to season ===
Season	Level	Division	Section	Position	Movements
2005	Tier 7	Division 6	Dalarna Mellersta	1st	Promoted
2006	Tier 7	Division 5	Dalarna Södra	1st	Promoted
2007	Tier 6	Division 4	Dalarna	1st	Promoted
2008	Tier 5	Division 3	Södra Norrland	1st	Promoted
2009	Tier 4	Division 2	Norra Svealand	1st	Promoted
2010	Tier 3	Division 1	Norra	6th	
2011	Tier 3	Division 1	Norra	4th	
2012	Tier 3	Division 1	Norra	8th	
2013	Tier 3	Division 1	Norra	2nd	Promotion Playoffs
2014	Tier 3	Division 1	Norra	3rd	
2015	Tier 3	Division 1	Norra	1st	Promoted
2016	Tier 2	Superettan	—	4th	
2017	Tier 2	Superettan	—	2nd	Promoted
2018	Tier 1	Allsvenskan	—	15th	Relegated
2019	Tier 2	Superettan	—	8th	
2020	Tier 2	Superettan	—	14th	Relegation Playoffs – Relegated
2021	Tier 3	Division 1	Norra	2nd	Promotion Playoffs
2022	Tier 2	Superettan	—	16th	Relegated
2023	Tier 3	Division 1	Norra	3rd	Relegated
2024	Tier 4	Division 2	Norra Svealand	14th	Relegated

* League restructuring in 2006 resulted in a new tier being created at Tier 3 and subsequent divisions dropping a level.

== Supporters ==
Roj Fans
- Established: 2010; 16 years ago
- Type: Supporter club
- Headquarters: Borlänge, Sweden
- Website: https://www.facebook.com/Rojfans

In 2010, the official supporter club from Västerås for Dalkurd FF with the name "Roj Fans" was founded. They are an independent non-profit organisation.

In 2018, they set the record for the lowest average attendance ever – 1,058 – in the history of the highest Swedish league, Allsvenskan. The record was previously held by Västerås IK, who had an average attendance of 1,125 in the inaugural season 1924–25. The game against BK Häcken with an attendance of 202 people also became the second lowest attendance in the history of the league.

In 2019, they set the record for the lowest average attendance in the history of Superettan – 168 people.

== Affiliated clubs ==
In 2019, Dalkurd FF announced a cooperation with Uppsala Kurd FK as part of strengthening the presence of Dalkurd FF in the Uppsala region. One of the aims of the cooperation was to make a natural way for talents in Uppsala to become a part of Dalkurd.

== Crest ==
The crest consist of a round circle with the flag of Kurdistan as well as two Dalecarlian horses. "Dal" and "Kurd FF" is spelled out in white letters on the top and bottom of the crest, as well as the year 2004.

== Kit ==
The traditional home colors of Dalkurd are all green. The Away kit is traditionally white but have previously been black, yellow and pink in the 2019 season. The club's kit manufacturer is Adidas.

== Players ==
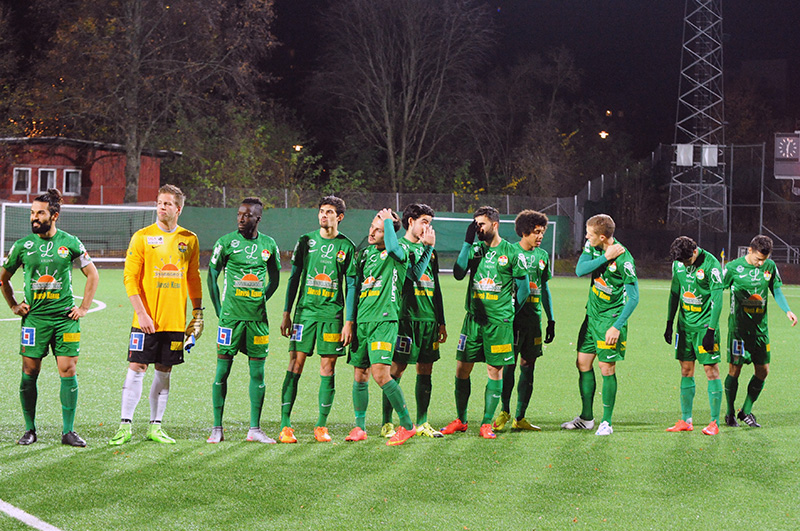
The Dalkurd starting eleven lining up before a game wearing their green home kit.

=== Current squad ===
As of 7 August 2024

Note: Flags indicate national team as defined under FIFA eligibility rules; some limited exceptions apply. Players may hold more than one non-FIFA nationality.

No.	Pos.	Nation	Player
1	GK	BEL	Senne Vitts
2	DF	SWE	Oskar Alvers
4	MF	BEL	Samuel Asoma
5	DF	SWE	Tim Hartzell
6	MF	RSA	Nana Ntuli
7	FW	SLE	Michael Kargbo
8	MF	NOR	Oussama Ali
9	FW	SWE	Rodin Deprem
10	FW	TUN	Imed Louati
11	MF	IRI	Bakhtiar Rahmani
12	FW	SWE	Tiago Silva
14	FW	SWE	Rasmus Niklasson

No.	Pos.	Nation	Player
15	FW	IRQ	Aysar Qasim Mohammed
16	DF	SWE	Rassa Rahmani
17	MF	SWE	Victor Svensson
18	FW	SWE	Rinwar Othman
19	DF	SWE	Alexander Ernström
22	MF	IRQ	Brwa Nouri
26	MF	SWE	Samuel Wikman
29	MF	SYR	Oliver Kass Kawo
31	GK	SWE	Simon Ericsson
32	MF	SUI	Stefan Wolf
34	DF	SWE	Isaak Höök
47	MF	IRI	Hija Izadi

=== Notable former players ===
- David Abidor (born 1992)

== Academy ==
- Deven Rashed
- Edvard Ståhlberg

== Personnel ==
Current technical staff
Position	Name
Head coach	(Sweden) Amir Azrafshan
Assistant coach	(Sweden) Peshraw Azizi
Physiotherapist	(Sweden) Daniel Karlsson
Goalkeeping coach	(Sweden) Jonas Bylund
Kit-man	(Sweden) Ove Ekstrand
Analyst – Fittness	(Sweden) Deven Rashed
Board members
Name	Position
Sarkat Junad	President Chairman Dalkurd
Bawer Alacabek	Chairman Dalkurd FF

=== List of the managers ===
- (Sweden) Elvan Cicen (2006)
- (Sweden) Tomas Blomberg (2007–08)
- (Sweden) Bernhard Brcic (2009)
- (Sweden) Lasse Ericsson (2010)
- (Sweden) Anders Sjöö (2010–11)
- (Sweden) Johan Sandahl (2011)
- (Sweden) Jonas Björkgren (2012)
- (Kenya) Robert Mambo Mumba (2013)
- (Sweden) Andreas Brännström (2014–15)
- (Sweden) Poya Asbaghi (2016–2017)
- (Sweden) Andreas Brännström (2017)
- (Bosnia and Herzegovina) Azrudin Valentić (2018)
- (Sweden) Johan Sandahl (2018)
- (Sweden) Paul Olausson (2019–2020)
- (Sweden) Mesut Meral (2021)
- (Sweden) Yasin Aras (2021)
- (Sweden) Dalibor Savic (2022)
- (Sweden) Amir Azrafshan (2022–2024)

== Honours ==
Dalkurd FF honours
Type	Competition	Titles	Seasons/Years
Domestic	Division 1 Norra	1	2015
Domestic	Division 2 Norra Svealand	1	2009
Domestic	Division 3 Södra Norrland	1	2008
Domestic	Division 4 Dalarna	1	2007
Domestic	Division 5 Dalarna Södra	1	2006
Domestic	Division 6 Dalarna Mellersta	1	2005

== Attendances ==
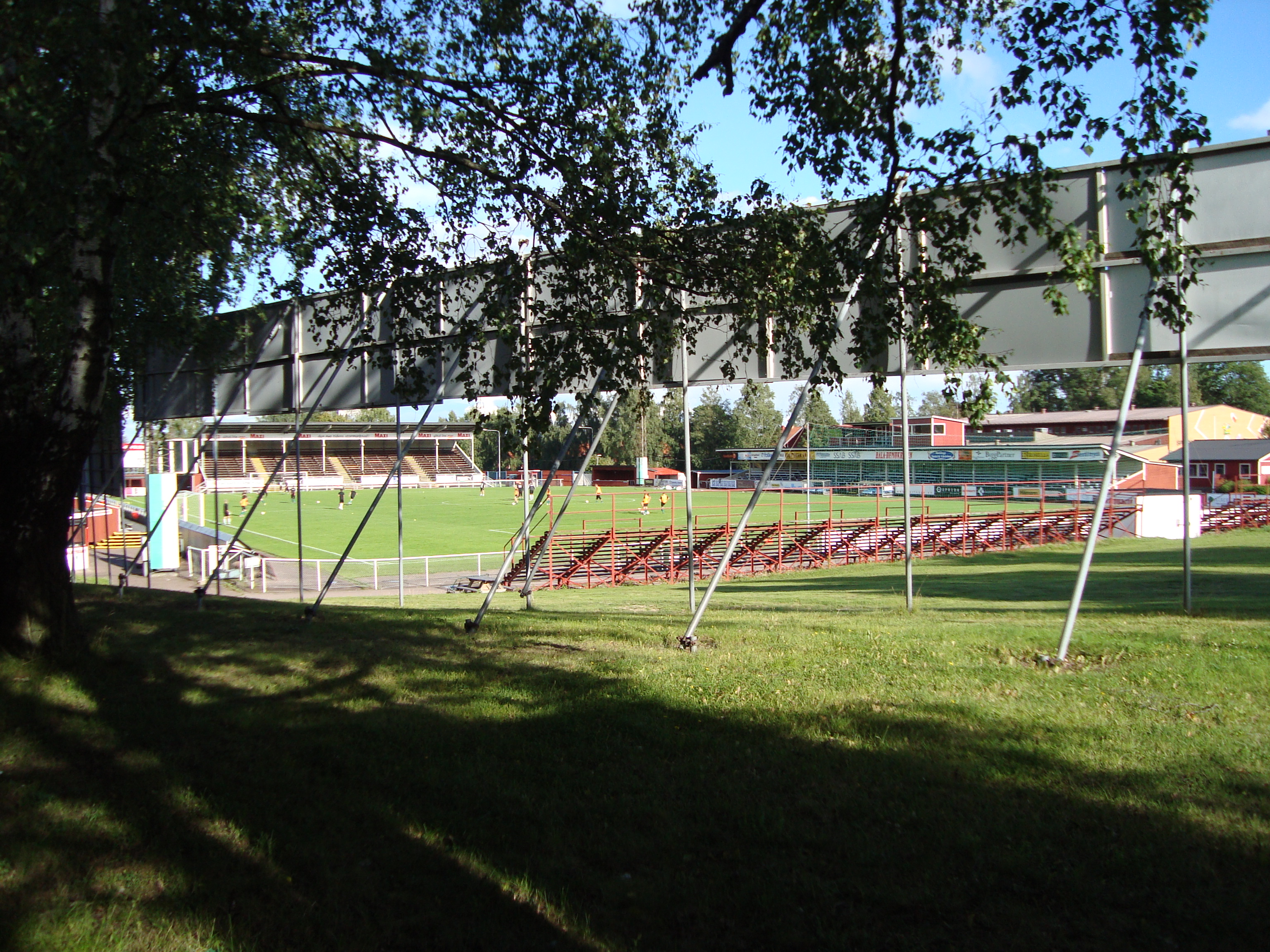
Domnarvsvallen

In recent seasons Dalkurd FF have had the following average attendances:

Season	Average attendance	Division / Section	Level
2007	Not available	Div 4 Dalarna	Tier 6
2008	179	Div 3 Södra Norrland	Tier 5
2009	456	Div 2 Norra Svealand	Tier 4
2010	298	Div 1 Norra	Tier 3
2011	315	Div 1 Norra	Tier 3
2012	365	Div 1 Norra	Tier 3
2013	282	Div 1 Norra	Tier 3
2014	466	Div 1 Norra	Tier 3
2015	475	Div 1 Norra	Tier 3
2016	1,119	Superettan	Tier 2

* Attendances are provided in the Publikliga sections of the Svenska Fotbollförbundet website.
