= Oscar Petersson =

Swedish footballer

Personal information
- Date of birth: 26 February 1999 (age 27)
- Place of birth: Sweden
- Height: 1.80 m (5 ft 11 in)
- Position: Midfielder

Team information
- Current team: Landskrona BoIS

Youth career
- –2016: Malmö FF

Senior career*
Years	Team	Apps	(Gls)
2017–2020	Halmstads BK	23	(1)
2020–	Landskrona BoIS	16	(4)

International career^{‡}
2015–2016	Sweden U17	8	(0)
- * Club domestic league appearances and goals as of July 3, 2018 ‡ National team caps and goals as of July 3, 2018

Oscar Petersson (born 26 February 1999) is a Swedish footballer who plays as a midfielder for Landskrona BoIS.
