= Fritiof Björkén =

Swedish footballer

Personal information
- Date of birth: 3 January 1991 (age 35)
- Place of birth: Sweden
- Height: 1.80 m (5 ft 11 in)
- Position: Midfielder

Youth career
- Lunds BK

Senior career*
Years	Team	Apps	(Gls)
2010–2014	Lunds BK	64	(7)
2015–2018	Östers IF	75	(7)
2018–2019	IF Brommapojkarna	56	(3)
2020–2024	Trelleborgs FF	129	(12)
- * Club domestic league appearances and goals as of 14 November 2024

Fritiof Björkén (born 3 January 1991) is a Swedish footballer.

== Career ==
=== Trelleborgs FF ===
On 9 December 2019 it was confirmed, that Björkén had joined Trelleborgs FF on a one-year deal.
