= 2019 Svenska Cupen final =

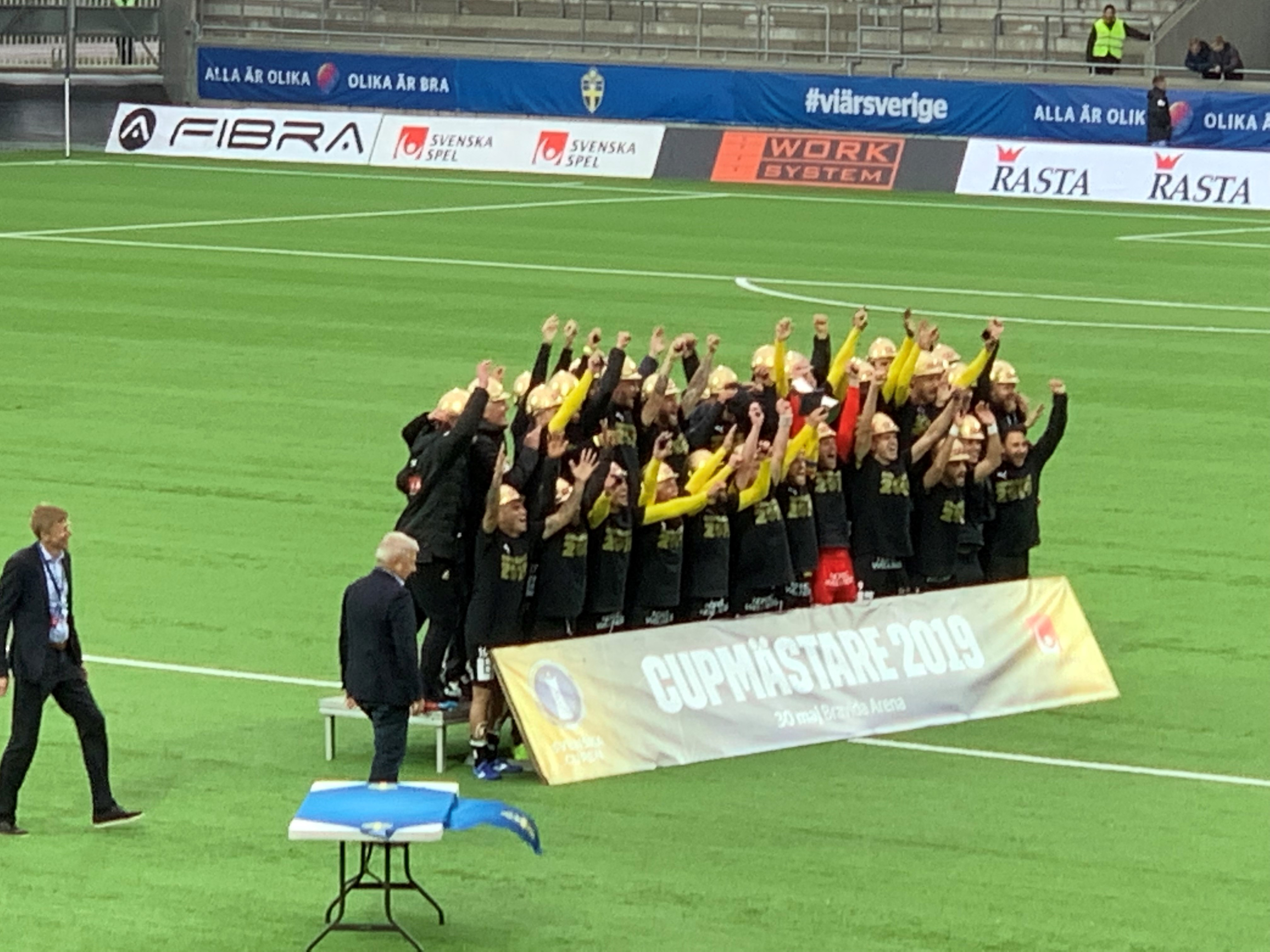
- Event: 2018–19 Svenska Cupen
BK Häcken	AFC Eskilstuna
3	0
- Date: 30 May 2019
- Venue: Bravida Arena, Gothenburg
- Referee: Kristoffer Karlsson
- Attendance: 4,958
- Weather: 50 °F, rain, low clouds, 94% humidity

The 2019 Svenska Cupen Final was played on 30 May 2019 between BK Häcken and AFC Eskilstuna at Bravida Arena, Gothenburg, the home pitch for BK Häcken. The final is the culmination of the 2018–19 Svenska Cupen, the 63rd season of the Svenska Cupen.

BK Häcken appeared in its 3rd Svenska Cupen final, having won the title once before in 2015–16. AFC Eskilstuna made its first ever appearance in the Svenska Cupen final. The winner of the final earned themselves a place in the second qualifying round of the 2019–20 UEFA Europa League.

BK Häcken won the final convincingly, earning its second Svenska Cup title.

== Teams ==
Team	Previous finals appearances (bold indicates winners)
BK Häcken	2 (1989–90, **2015–16**)
AFC Eskilstuna	0

== Venue ==
Since 2014–15, Svenska Cupen finals have been held in the home ground of the higher-seeded team of the tournament in an effort to bolster attendance and fan support. Bravida Arena, home pitch of BK Häcken, hosted its first Svenska Cupen final since its opening in June 2015.

== Background ==
Häcken competed in its third-ever final, having won its only previous title in 2015–16, beating Malmö FF in a penalty shootout. Eskilstuna made its first-ever appearance in a Svenska Cupen final in just its third season as a club in its current iteration. Formerly, the club competed as FC Väsby United (2005–12) and AFC United (2013–16), and spent the 2018 season in the second-tier Superettan.

== Route to the final ==
Note: In all results below, the score of the finalist is given first (H: home; A: away).

BK Häcken		Round	AFC Eskilstuna	
Opponent	Result		Opponent	Result
Bye		First round	Bye	
Växjö United FC (5)	5–0 (A)	Second round	Team TG FF (3)	4–1 (A)
IK Brage (2)	6–1 (H)	Group stage	Assyriska IK (3)	4–0 (A)
FC Rosengård (4)	4–0 (A)	Group stage	IFK Värnamo (3)	4–0 (H)
IF Brommapojkarna (2)	1–0 (H)	Group stage	IFK Norrköping	1–1 (A)
GAIS (2)	4–1 (H)	Quarterfinals	Halmstads BK (2)	2–1 (H) (a.e.t.)
Djurgårdens IF (1)	3–2 (A) (a.e.t.)	Semifinals	AIK (1)	1–1 (A) (a.e.t.) (6–5 p)

== Match ==
=== Details ===
30 May 2019
15:00

BK Häcken (1)	3–0	AFC Eskilstuna (1)
Faltsetas 10'; Toivio 76'; Lundberg 90+3'	Report

Bravida Arena, Gothenburg
Attendance: 4,958
Referee: Kristoffer Karlsson

**BK Häcken**	**AFC Eskilstuna**

GK	26	(Sweden) Peter Abrahamsson
DF	22	(Finland) Joona Toivio	76'
DF	12	(Nigeria) Godswill Ekpolo
DF	21	(Sweden) Rasmus Lindgren (c)
MF	8	(Sweden) Erik Friberg
MF	99	(Iraq) Ahmed Yasin	(substituted off) 90+2'
MF	6	(Sweden) Alexander Faltsetas	10' (substituted off) 80'
MF	28	(Sweden) Adam Andersson
MF	19	(Sweden) Daleho Irandust	(substituted off) 88'
MF	10	(Brazil) Paulinho
FW	9	(Sweden) Alexander Jeremejeff
Substitutes:
MF	17	(Sweden) Gustav Berggren	(substituted on) 80'
FW	23	(Sweden) Viktor Lundberg	90+3' (substituted on) 88'
MF	7	(Sweden) Mervan Çelik	(substituted on) 90+2'
GK	1	(Sweden) Christoffer Källqvist
DF	36	(Sweden) Johan Hammar
MF	11	(Ghana) Nasiru Mohammed
DF	14	(Sweden) Oskar Sverrisson
Coach:
(Sweden) Andreas Alm

GK	1	(Sweden) Ole Söderberg
DF	6	(Sweden) Jesper Björkman
DF	19	(Lebanon) Felix Michel	(yellow card) 72'
DF	15	(Spain) José León	(yellow card) 21'
DF	2	(Sweden) Adnan Kojic
DF	3	(Sweden) Kadir Hodžić
MF	21	(Kosovo) Anel Raskaj (c)	(yellow card) 42'
FW	10	(Sweden) Ferid Ali	(substituted off) 66'
MF	7	(Ukraine) Ivan Bobko	(substituted off) 88'
MF	5	(Sweden) Gustav Jarl	(substituted off) 74'
FW	16	(Nigeria) Samuel Nnamani
Substitutes:
DF	13	(Sweden) Wilhelm Loeper	(substituted on) 66'
MF	11	(Sweden) Daniel Miljanović	(substituted on) 74'
MF	25	(Sweden) Jacob Lackéll	(substituted on) 88'
GK	91	(Ukraine) Ihor Levchenko
DF	12	(Sweden) Medi Dresevic
MF	14	(Croatia) Kristijan Miljević
GK	66	(Sweden) Wille Jakobsson
Coach:
(Sweden) Nemanja Miljanović

Assistant referees:
Fredrik Nilsson
Magnus Sjöblom

**Match rules**

- 90 minutes.
- 30 minutes of extra time if necessary.
- Penalty shoot-out if scores still level.
- Seven named substitutes, of which up to three may be used.
