= 2018–19 Svenska Cupen =

Tournament details
- Country: Sweden
- Dates: 15 May 2018 – 30 May 2019
- Teams: 96 (competition proper)

Final positions
- Champions: BK Häcken (2nd title)
- Runners-up: AFC Eskilstuna

Tournament statistics
- Top goal scorer: Mervan Çelik (10 goals)

The 2018–19 Svenska Cupen was the 63rd season of the Svenska Cupen and the seventh season with the current format. The winners of the competition will secure a spot in the second qualifying round of the 2019–20 UEFA Europa League, unless they had already qualified for European competition in the 2019–20 season, in which case the qualification spot will go to fourth-placed team of the 2018 Allsvenskan. A total of 96 clubs will enter the competition, 64 teams from district sites and 32 from the Allsvenskan and the Superettan.

The first rounds will be played between 15 May and 4 July 2018. The first round draw was announced on 25 April 2018. Times up to 27 October 2018 and from 31 March 2019 are CEST (UTC+2). Times from 28 October 2018 to 30 March 2019 are CET (UTC+1).

== Round and draw dates ==
The schedule of the competition is as follows.

| Phase | Round | Draw date | Match date |
|---|---|---|---|
| Initial rounds | Round 1 | 25 April 2018 | 15 May – 4 July 2018 |
| Initial rounds | Round 2 | 7 July 2018 | 21 – 23 August 2018 |
| Group stage | Matchday 1 | 3 December 2018 | 16 – 17 February 2019 |
| Group stage | Matchday 2 | 3 December 2018 | 23 – 24 February 2019 |
| Group stage | Matchday 3 | 3 December 2018 | 2 – 3 March 2019 |
| Knockout stage | Quarter-finals | 4 March 2019 | 9 – 10 March 2019 |
| Knockout stage | Semi-finals | 4 March 2019 | 16 – 17 March 2019 |
| Knockout stage | Final | 4 March 2019 | 30 May 2019 |

== Teams ==
| Round | Clubs remaining | Clubs involved | Winners from previous round | New entries this round | Leagues entering at this round |
|---|---|---|---|---|---|
| Round 1 | 96 | 64 | 2 | 62 | Division 1 (19 teams); Division 2 (28 teams); Division 3 (10 teams); Division 4 (7 teams) |
| Round 2 | 64 | 64 | 32 | 32 | Allsvenskan; Superettan |
| Group stage | 32 | 32 | 32 | none | none |
| Quarter-finals | 8 | 8 | 8 | none | none |
| Semi-finals | 4 | 4 | 4 | none | none |
| Final | 2 | 2 | 2 | none | none |

== Round 1 ==
64 teams from the third tier or lower of the Swedish league system competed in this round.

| 15 May 2018 | Växjö BK (6) | 1–2 | Karlskrona UF (5) | Växjö |
| 19:00 | Andersson 13' | Report | M. Ahmed 57', 72' | Stadium: Sportfältet Teleborg Konstgräs; Attendance: 50; Referee: Ismar Ramadani |

| 16 May 2018 | Karlbergs BK (4) | 3–2 | Vasalunds IF (4) | Stockholm |
| 19:00 | Kousis 58'; Gassama 81'; Petterson Kettler 90+3' | Report | Malmborg 12' (pen.); Rako 26' | Stadium: Stadshagens IP; Attendance: 150; Referee: Ozan Camilbel |

| 22 May 2018 | Hässleholms IF (4) | 1–0 | Kristianstad FC (3) | Hässleholm |
| 19:00 | Willard 70' | Report | | Stadium: Österås IP; Attendance: 103; Referee: Christoffer Södergren |

| 22 May 2018 | IF Sylvia (4) | 2–0 | Oskarshamns AIK (3) | Norrköping |
| 19:30 | Bengtsson 37'; Ahad 53' | Report | | Stadium: Nya Parken; Attendance: 80; Referee: Gheorghe Piscoran |

| 23 May 2018 | Enskede IK (4) | 2–1 | Sollentuna FK (3) | Stockholm |
| 19:00 | Folkesson 76', 90+3' | Report | Löfberg 28' | Stadium: Enskede IP 1 Attendance: 100; Referee: Mohammadreza Faghani |

| 23 May 2018 | Tyresö FF (5) | 0–3 | Arameisk-Syrianska IF (3) | Tyresö |
| 19:45 | | Report | Ceylan 8'; Rojas 73'; Mutic 45' | Stadium: Tyresövallen; Attendance: 305; Referee: Diako Behnam |

| 29 May 2018 | Lindome GIF (4) | 3–1 | Tvååkers IF (3) | Lindome |
| 19:00 | Eteus 5'; Hansson 29'; Månsson 61' | Report | 13' (o.g.) | Stadium: Lindevi IP (Konstgräs); Attendance: 87; Referee: Danial Ahmadi |

| 29 May 2018 | Brottby SK (6) | 4–2 | IFK Haninge (4) | Brottby |
| 19:45 | Grésillon 2'; Berger 51'; Engblom 53'; Afshari 90' | Report | Milosavljevic 9'; Notice 77' | Stadium: Össeby IP Konstgräs; Attendance: 350; Referee: Vedad Kestendzic |

| 30 May 2018 | IS Halmia (4) | 0–1 | Eskilsminne IF (3) | Halmstad |
| 19:15 | | Report | Lundborg 90' | Stadium: Örjans Vall; Attendance: 201; Referee: Linuz Söderberg |

| 6 June 2018 | Tranås FF (6) | 1–2 | Smedby AIS (5) | Tranås |
| 15:00 | Arvidsson 82' (o.g.) | Report | Ilia 30'; Radesjö 64' | Stadium: Bredstorps IP - Konstgräsplan; Attendance: 214; Referee: Shayan Mollaei |

| 6 June 2018 | Gamla Upsala SK (4) | 2–2 (a.e.t.) (4–5 p) | Strömsbergs IF (4) | Uppsala |
| 17:00 | Hennig 75'; Lundqvist 81' | Report | Torstensson 20'; Abdi 50' | Stadium: Gamlis IP; Attendance: 124; Referee: Alexander Milovanovic |
| | Penalties |
| | Östlund (penalty scored); Jalil (penalty scored); Lindström (penalty missed); Mellberg (penalty scored); Hennig (penalty scored); Pedersen (penalty missed) | | Andersson (penalty scored); Jonsson (penalty scored); Torstensson (penalty scored); Hamad (penalty scored); Ehm (penalty missed); Pettersson (penalty scored) |

| 12 June 2018 | Växjö United FC (5) | 5–1 | Dalstorps IF (4) | Växjö |
| 19:00 | Durugbor 27'; Mohamud 32', 84', 87'; Magashy 90' | Report | I. Johannson 50' | Stadium: Araby Park Arena; Attendance: 254; Referee: Håkan Söderman |

| 12 June 2018 | Skoftebyns IF (4) | 3–1 (a.e.t.) | Stenungsunds IF (4) | Trollhättan |
| 19:30 | Lext 19'; Andersson 105'; Larsson 115' | Report | Widenbäck 13' | Stadium: Nysätra IP Konstgräs; Attendance: 150; Referee: Christer Hallén |

| 13 June 2018 | IFK Lidingö (5) | 0–1 | Akropolis IF (3) | Lidingö |
| 19:15 | | Report | 68' (o.g.) | Stadium: Lidingövallen 2 Attendance: 422; Referee: Suhel Youssef |

| 13 June 2018 | IFK Aspudden-Tellus (4) | 3–3 (a.e.t.) (1–4 p) | Nyköpings BIS (3) | Stockholm |
| 19:30 | Wanselius 9' (pen.), 75' (pen.); Lividikos 19' | Report | Kouakou 2'; Karlsson 73', 85' | Stadium: Aspuddens IP; Attendance: 143; Referee: Erik Skotte |
| | Penalties |
| | Brunzell (penalty scored); Abdulla (penalty missed); Wanselius (penalty missed) | | Ahmetovic (penalty scored); Olafsson (penalty scored); Kroon (penalty scored); Karlsson (penalty scored) |

| 21 June 2018 | Motala AIF FK (4) | 5–3 (a.e.t.) | Husqvarna FF (3) | Motala |
| 19:00 | Lugonja 32'; Kafari 58'; Ehn 92', 113'; Egnell 116' | Report | Shala 10'; Binns 69' (pen.); 96' (o.g.) | Stadium: Motala Idrottspark; Attendance: 153; Referee: Robin Andersson |

| 26 June 2018 | Österlen FF (4) | 2–3 | Lunds BK (3) | Skillinge |
| 18:45 | Karlsson 71'; Blixt 72' | Report | Birgersson 2'; Hillstedt 32'; Sax 60' | Stadium: Skillinge IP; Referee: Christoffer Södergren |

| 26 June 2018 | IFK Åmål (5) | 2–3 | Karlstad BK (4) | Åmål |
| 19:00 | Plakalo 5', 46' | Report | Edvardsen 45', 83'; Alvers 76' | Stadium: Örnäsvallens IP; Referee: Christoffer Aidesjö |

| 26 June 2018 | Hisingsbacka FC (4) | 3–1 (a.e.t.) | Utsiktens BK (3) | Gothenburg |
| 19:00 | F. Zanjanchi 79'; Sassi 104'; Hegab 117' | Report | Evensen 18' | Stadium: Backavallen; Attendance: 209; Referee: Linuz Söderberg |

| 26 June 2018 | FK Besa (6) | 0–5 | FC Rosengård 1917 (4) | Landskrona |
| 19:00 | | Report | Sherifi 16'; Hussein 67', 71', 89'; Sakirovski 77' | Stadium: Landskrona IP B-plan; Referee: Mohamed Rachid |

| 26 June 2018 | Eslövs BK (6) | 0–2 (a.e.t.) | Torns IF (3) | Eslöv |
| 19:00 | | Report | Nilsson 98'; Seljmani 120' | Stadium: Ekevalla IP, Eslöv A-plan; Attendance: 212; Referee: Bobby Sjögren-Engels |

| 26 June 2018 | IFK Timrå (5) | 1–6 | Friska Viljor FC (4) | Timrå |
| 19:30 | Buzuku 47' | Report | Johannson 19', 67'; Håkansson 45'; Duckrell 50', 90'; Nordin 63' | Stadium: Timrå IP Konstgräs; Referee: Rickard Lingensjö |

| 26 June 2018 | Hudiksvalls Förenade FF (4) | 7–0 | IFK Östersund (4) | Hudiksvall |
| 20:00 | Ruzicka 20', 72', 79'; Sener 45', 53'; Lööf 49'; 65' (o.g.) | Report | | Stadium: Glysis Sparbanken Arena; Attendance: 157; Referee: Robert Ahlman |

| 27 June 2018 | IFK Luleå (4) | 0–2 | Team TG FF (3) | Luleå |
| 19:00 | | Report | Lidberg 0'; Åberg 56' | Stadium: Skogsvallen; Attendance: 148; Referee: Pontus Olofsson |

| 27 June 2018 | FC Gute (4) | 2–1 | Värmdö IF (4) | Visby |
| 19:00 | 53' (o.g.); Nobell 70' | Report | 48' | Stadium: Gutavallen; Attendance: 201; Referee: Richard Holöien |

| 27 June 2018 | Kvarnsvedens IK (4) | 0–2 | Sandvikens IF (3) | Borlänge |
| 19:30 | | Report | Bellander 44'; Nordin 56' | Stadium: Ljungbergsplanen; Attendance: 77; Referee: Richard Sundell |

| 3 July 2018 | Onsala BK (5) | 1–3 | Assyriska BK (4) | Onsala |
| 19:30 | Jarnvik 83' | Report | Youkhanna 8'; Alsultan 34'; Guli 90+4' | Stadium: Rydets IP A Attendance: 100; Referee: Denis Oppong |

| 3 July 2018 | Alingsås IF (6) | 1–6 | Sävedalens IF (4) | Alingsås |
| 20:00 | A. Johansson 84' | Report | Brahimi 19'; Ekblad 21', 60', 75'; Tengfjord 25'; Alnäs 86' | Stadium: Mjörnvallen, A-plan; Attendance: 78; Referee: Admir Hasanbegovic |

| 4 July 2018 | Syrianska FC (3) | 0–7 | Västerås SK (3) | Södertälje |
| 19:00 | | Report | Ljevar 10' (pen.); Smajic 17', 53', 54'; Salimi 25', 87'; Hellgren 86' (pen.) | Stadium: Södertälje Fotbollsarena; Attendance: 225; Referee: Suhel Youssef |

| 4 July 2018 | Karlslunds IF HFK (3) | 1–4 (a.e.t.) | Carlstad United BK (3) | Örebro |
| 19:00 | Bell 5' | Report | Ike 12', 93'; Nyman 113', 120' | Stadium: Karlslund Arena; Attendance: 177; Referee: Pedram Najafi |

| 4 July 2018 | Lidköpings FK (5) | 0–3 | Skövde AIK (3) | Lidköping |
| 19:00 | | Report | 20' (o.g.); Örqvist 75'; Granath 81' | Stadium: Framnäs IP A-plan; Referee: Adnan Busuladzic |

| 4 July 2018 | IFK Falköping FF (5) | 0–3 | Assyriska IK (4) | Falköping |
| 19:00 | | Report | Gjikokaj 12', 66'; Ishak 90' | Stadium: Björkåsen A Referee: Ademir Avdic |

== Round 2 ==
64 teams will compete in this round. 32 winners from Round 1, and all 32 teams from the 2018 Allsvenskan and the 2018 Superettan. The draw was held on July 7, 2018 with games scheduled to be played on August 21–23, 2018.

| 15 August 2018 | Karlstad BK (4) | 1–0 | Gefle IF (2) | Karlstad |
| 18:00 | Haider 65' | Report | | Stadium: Våxnäs IP; Referee: Fredrik Oppong |

| 21 August 2018 | Team TG FF (3) | 0–3 | AFC Eskilstuna (2) | Umeå |
| 18:30 | | Report | Pelé 22'; A. Michel 73'; F. Michel 93' | Stadium: Umeå Energi Arena; Attendance: 214; Referee: Joel Bäckström |

| 21 August 2018 | Strömsbergs IF (4) | 0–4 | IK Sirius FK (1) | Tierp |
| 18:30 | | Report | Ogbu 21'; Sirelius 39'; Georges 44'; Offia 85' | Stadium: Hedens IP; Attendance: 550; Referee: Patrik Eriksson |

| 21 August 2018 | Karlbergs BK (4) | 1–2 (a.e.t.) | Dalkurd FF (1) | Stockholm |
| 18:30 | Simba 67' | Report | Azizi 80'; Pllana 93' | Stadium: Kristinebergs IP; Attendance: 850; Referee: Victor Wolf |

| 21 August 2018 | Skoftebyns IF (4) | 1–4 | Falkenbergs FF (2) | Trollhättan |
| 18:30 | Larsson 70' | Report | Krizanović 4'; Egbuchulam 15', 60'; Östlind 24' | Stadium: Nysätra IP; Attendance: 227; Referee: Fikret Buqa |

| 21 August 2018 | Hässleholms IF (4) | 3–2 (a.e.t.) | Trelleborgs FF (1) | Hässleholm |
| 18:30 | Wedenell 18', 75' (pen.), 112' | Report | A. Nilsson 24'; Camara Jönsson 90' | Stadium: Österås IP; Attendance: 1,147; Referee: Tess Olofsson |

| 22 August 2018 | Nyköpings BIS (3) | 3–2 (a.e.t.) | GIF Sundsvall (1) | Nyköping |
| 17:30 | Burman 61'; Bulut 104'; Karlsson 118' | Report | Batanero 73'; Haro 94' | Stadium: Rosvalla IP; Referee: Alexander Pavlovic |

| 22 August 2018 | FC Rosengård 1917 (4) | 2–0 | Landskrona BoIS (2) | Malmö |
| 18:00 | Hussein 3', 26' | Report | | Stadium: Rosengårds IP; Attendance: 320; Referee: Mirza Kazic |

| 22 August 2018 | Assyriska IK (4) | 3–1 | Kalmar FF (1) | Jönköping |
| 18:00 | Nkuru 38'; Watson 71'; Laptev 73' | Report | Dyrestam 39' | Stadium: Stadsparksvallen; Referee: Per Melin |

| 22 August 2018 | Sävedalens IF (4) | 0–2 | Halmstads BK (2) | Gothenburg |
| 18:00 | | Report | Kinoshita 61'; Gudmundsson 82' | Stadium: Vallhamra; Referee: Magnus Lindgren |

| 22 August 2018 | Hudiksvalls FF (4) | 1–3 | Jönköpings Södra IF (2) | Hudiksvall |
| 18:30 | Sener 68' | Report | Gero 82'; Siwe 89'; Al-Ammari 90' | Stadium: Glysisvallen; Attendance: 450; Referee: Arian Chalak |

| 22 August 2018 | IF Sylvia (4) | 0–4 | Djurgårdens IF (1) | Norrköping |
| 18:30 | | Report | Karlström 21'; Danielsson 30'; Chilufya 61'; Une Larsson 63' | Stadium: Nya Parken; Referee: Nermin Cisic |

| 22 August 2018 | Eskilsminne IF (3) | 1–0 | Helsingborgs IF (2) | Helsingborg |
| 18:30 | Larsson 68' | Report | | Stadium: Harlyckans IP; Attendance: 2,683; Referee: Kaspar Sjöberg |

| 22 August 2018 | Karlskrona UF (5) | 0–6 | Varbergs BoIS (2) | Karlskrona |
| 18:30 | | Report | Palmquist 39', 61'; Beqaj 45', 82'; Olsson 52'; Fofana 77' | Stadium: Västra Mark IP; Referee: Adi Aganovic |

| 22 August 2018 | Motala AIF (4) | 0–4 | IF Elfsborg (1) | Motala |
| 18:30 | | Report | Bajrami 4', 45'; Karlsson 28'; Kabashi 35' | Stadium: Motala Idrottspark; Attendance: 1,654; Referee: Granit Maqedonci |

| 22 August 2018 | Växjö United FC (5) | 0–5 | BK Häcken (1) | Växjö |
| 18:30 | | Report | Çelik 18', 22', 37', 48'; Kamara 25' | Stadium: Myresjöhus Arena; Attendance: 200; Referee: Fredrik Klitte |

| 23 August 2018 | Carlstad United BK (3) | 0–3 | Hammarby IF (1) | Karlstad |
| 18:00 | | Report | Bengtsson 9'; Rodić 29'; Halik Hudu 90+3' | Stadium: Tingvalla IP; Attendance: 2,441; Referee: Glenn Nyberg |

| 23 August 2018 | Brottby SK (6) | 0–10 | IFK Norrköping (1) | Brottby |
| 18:30 | | Report | Holmberg 22', 65'; Johansson 25'; Larsson 28', 53', 72'; Vall 42'; Jakobsen 75'; Fransson 78', 86' | Stadium: Össeby IP; Attendance: 1,962; Referee: Ozan Camlibel |

| 23 August 2018 | Enskede IK (4) | 1–2 (a.e.t.) | Degerfors IF (2) | Stockholm |
| 18:30 | 46' | Report | 55'; 110' | Stadium: Enskede IP; Attendance: 340; Referee: Fredrik Hansson |

| 23 August 2018 | Arameisk-Syrianska IF (3) | 1–2 | IK Frej (2) | Botkyrka |
| 18:30 | 90' | Report | Ekdal 33'; 90' | Stadium: Brunna IP; Attendance: 201; Referee: Farouk Nehdi |

| 23 August 2018 | FC Gute (4) | 2–5 | Östersunds FK (1) | Visby |
| 18:30 | Dahlström 49'; Jan 51' | Report | Fritzson 2', 64'; Arhin 11'; Sellars 19'; Kroon 71' | Stadium: Gutavallen; Attendance: 1,098; Referee: Adam Ladebäck |

| 23 August 2018 | Akropolis IF (3) | 1–2 | Örebro SK (1) | Stockholm |
| 18:30 | Lindqvist 88' | Report | Sköld 48'; Besara 90' | Stadium: Spånga IP; Referee: Rambod Beigi |

| 23 August 2018 | Västerås SK Fotboll (3) | 1–3 | IK Brage (2) | Västerås |
| 18:30 | Karlberg 89' | Report | Kamp 2'; Kouakou 18'; Lundin 33' | Stadium: Solid Park Arena; Attendance: 680; Referee: Johan Krantz |

| 23 August 2018 | Sandvikens IF (3) | 0–2 | AIK (1) | Sandviken |
| 18:30 | | Report | Milošević 29'; Jansson 59' | Stadium: Jernvallen; Attendance: 2,156; Referee: Mohammed Al-Hakim |

| 23 August 2018 | Friska Viljor FC (4) | 1–3 (a.e.t.) | IF Brommapojkarna (1) | Örnsköldsvik |
| 18:30 | Nordin 88' | Report | Lahne 6'; Nilsson 112'; Petrović 117' | Stadium: Skyttis IP; Attendance: 1,247; Referee: Niklas Abrahamsson |

| 23 August 2018 | Smedby AIS (5) | 0–3 | GAIS (2) | Norrköping |
| 18:30 | | Report | Zeljkovic 42'; Westermark 60'; Djuric 71' | Stadium: Mirum Arena; Attendance: 399; Referee: Almir Kadiric |

| 23 August 2018 | Assyriska BK (5) | 0–5 | IFK Värnamo (2) | Gothenburg |
| 18:30 | | Report | 12'; 39'; 43'; 80'; 90' | Stadium: Ruddalens IP; Referee: Haris Memisevic |

| 23 August 2018 | Lindome GIF (4) | 0–1 | Norrby IF (2) | Lindome |
| 18:30 | | Report | Ärlig 49' | Stadium: Lindevi IP; Referee: Fredrik Oppong |

| 23 August 2018 | Skövde AIK (3) | 0–3 | Östers IF (2) | Skövde |
| 18:30 | | Report | Andreasson 39'; Örnblom 49'; Ahrn 64' | Stadium: Södermalms IP; Attendance: 348; Referee: Joakim Östling |

| 23 August 2018 | Hisingsbacka FC (4) | 1–5 | Örgryte IS (2) | Gothenburg |
| 18:30 | Skendorovic 26' | Report | Paulson 7' (pen.), 77'; Altemark Vanneryr 33', 43'; Sliper 40' | Stadium: Backavallen; Attendance: 1,100; Referee: Bojan Pandžić |

| 23 August 2018 | Torns IF (3) | 0–4 | IFK Göteborg (1) | Lund |
| 18:30 | | Report | Abraham 9'; Wernersson 73'; Degerlund 76'; Ohlsson 86' | Stadium: Klostergårdens IP; Attendance: 2,203; Referee: Robert Daradic |

| 22 November 2018 | Lunds BK (3) | 0–2 | Malmö FF (1) | Lund |
| 19:00 | | Report | Rosenberg 56'; Molins 90+2' | Stadium: Klostergårdens IP; Attendance: 3,619; Referee: Kristoffer Karlsson |

== Group stage ==
The 32 winners from round 2 were divided into eight groups of four teams. The 16 highest ranked winners from the previous rounds were seeded to the top two positions in each group and the 16 remaining winners were unseeded in the draw. The ranking of the 16 seeded teams was decided by league position in the 2018 season. All teams in the group stage will play each other once, the highest ranked teams from the previous rounds and teams from tier three or lower will have the right to play two home matches.

=== Qualified teams ===
Seeded

- AIK (1)
- BK Häcken (1)
- Dalkurd FF (1)
- Djurgårdens IF (1)
- IF Brommapojkarna (1)
- IFK Göteborg (1)
- IFK Norrköping (1)
- Hammarby IF (1)
- IF Elfsborg (1)
- IK Sirius (1)
- Malmö FF (1)
- Örebro SK (1)
- Östersunds FK (1)
- AFC Eskilstuna (2)
- Falkenbergs FF (2)
- Örgryte IS (2)

Unseeded

- Degerfors IF (2)
- GAIS (2)
- Halmstads BK (2)
- IFK Värnamo (2)
- IK Brage (2)
- IK Frej (2)
- Jönköpings Södra IF (2)
- Norrby IF (2)
- Varbergs BoIS (2)
- Östers IF (2)
- Eskilsminne IF (3)
- Nyköpings BIS (3)
- Assyriska IK (4)
- FC Rosengård (4)
- Hässleholms IF (4)
- Karlstad BK (4)

=== Group 1 ===
| Pos | Team | Pld | W | D | L | GF | GA | GD | Pts | Qualification | AIK | JSIF | ÖIS | NIF |
|---|---|---|---|---|---|---|---|---|---|---|---|---|---|---|
| 1 | AIK | 3 | 2 | 1 | 0 | 3 | 1 | +2 | 7 | Advance to Knockout stage | | 1–0 | 1–0 | |
| 2 | Jönköpings Södra IF | 3 | 2 | 0 | 1 | 3 | 2 | +1 | 6 | | | | | 1–0 |
| 3 | Örgryte IS | 3 | 1 | 0 | 2 | 3 | 3 | 0 | 3 | | | 1–2 | | 2–0 |
| 4 | Norrby IF | 3 | 0 | 1 | 2 | 1 | 4 | −3 | 1 | | 1–1 | | | |

Updated to match(es) played on 2 March 2019. Source: Swedish Football Association
Rules for classification: 1) Points; 2) Goal difference; 3) Goals scored; 4) Head-to-head record; 5) Highest ranked team

| 16 February 2019 Matchday 1 | AIK (1) | 1–0 | Jönköpings Södra IF (2) | Solna |
| 14:00 (UTC+1) | Sundgren 15' (pen.) | Report | | Stadium: Friends Arena; Attendance: 9,995; Referee: Viktor Wolf |

| 16 February 2019 Matchday 1 | Örgryte IS (2) | 2–0 | Norrby IF (2) | Gothenburg |
| 14:00 (UTC+1) | Bernhardsson 45'; Sköld 48' | Report | | Stadium: Valhalla IP; Attendance: 1,149; Referee: Johan Krantz |

| 24 February 2019 Matchday 2 | Norrby IF (2) | 1–1 | AIK (1) | Borås |
| 17:00 (UTC+1) | Yarsuvat 25' | Report | Elyounoussi 43' | Stadium: Borås Arena; Attendance: 974; Referee: Granit Maqedonci |

| 24 February 2019 Matchday 2 | Örgryte IS (2) | 1–2 | Jönköpings Södra IF (2) | Gothenburg |
| 17:00 (UTC+1) | Lindblad 11' | Report | Orlov 52'; Jallow 85' | Stadium: Valhalla IP; Attendance: 1,012; Referee: Nermin Cisic |

| 2 March 2019 Matchday 3 | Jönköpings Södra IF (2) | 1–0 | Norrby IF (2) | Jönköping |
| 14:00 (UTC+1) | Jallow 30' | Report | | Stadium: Tipshallen Elmia; Attendance: 654; Referee: Joakim Östling |

| 2 March 2019 Matchday 3 | AIK (1) | 1–0 | Örgryte IS (2) | Solna |
| 14:00 (UTC+1) | Goitom 85' | Report | | Stadium: Friends Arena; Attendance: 7,875; Referee: Kristoffer Karlsson |

=== Group 2 ===
| Pos | Team | Pld | W | D | L | GF | GA | GD | Pts | Qualification | AFC | IFKN | AIK | IFKV |
|---|---|---|---|---|---|---|---|---|---|---|---|---|---|---|
| 1 | AFC Eskilstuna | 3 | 2 | 1 | 0 | 9 | 1 | +8 | 7 | Advance to Knockout stage | | | | 4–0 |
| 2 | IFK Norrköping | 3 | 2 | 1 | 0 | 6 | 2 | +4 | 7 | | 1–1 | | | 3–1 |
| 3 | Assyriska IK | 3 | 1 | 0 | 2 | 4 | 9 | −5 | 3 | | 0–4 | 0–2 | | |
| 4 | IFK Värnamo | 3 | 0 | 0 | 3 | 4 | 11 | −7 | 0 | | | | 3–4 | |

Updated to match(es) played on 2 March 2019. Source: Swedish Football Association
Rules for classification: 1) Points; 2) Goal difference; 3) Goals scored; 4) Head-to-head record; 5) Highest ranked team

| 17 February 2019 Matchday 1 | Assyriska IK (3) | 0–4 | AFC Eskilstuna (1) | Jönköping |
| 15:00 (UTC+1) | | Report | Nnamani 22'; Jarl 32'; Michel 44'; Miljevic 74' | Stadium: Tipshallen Elmia; Attendance: 420; Referee: Nermin Cisic |

| 17 February 2019 Matchday 1 | IFK Norrköping (1) | 3–1 | IFK Värnamo (3) | Norrköping |
| 17:00 (UTC+1) | Holmberg 35' (pen.), 76'; Larsson 64' | Report | Marcelo 75' | Stadium: Östgötaporten; Attendance: 2,168; Referee: Kaspar Sjöberg |

| 22 February 2019 Matchday 2 | Assyriska IK (3) | 0–2 | IFK Norrköping (1) | Jönköping |
| 19:00 (UTC+1) | | Report | Skrabb 32'; Larsson 63' | Stadium: Tipshallen Elmia; Attendance: 622; Referee: Joakim Östling |

| 23 February 2019 Matchday 2 | AFC Eskilstuna (1) | 4–0 | IFK Värnamo (3) | Eskilstuna |
| 16:00 (UTC+1) | Bobko 43'; Jarl 47'; Kojic 55'; Hodzic 64' | Report | | Stadium: Tunavallen; Attendance: 426; Referee: Patrik Eriksson |

| 2 March 2019 Matchday 3 | IFK Värnamo (3) | 3–4 | Assyriska IK (3) | Värnamo |
| 14:00 (UTC+1) | Ask 6'; Marcelo 28'; Brilhante 50' | Report | Shaw 10', 64', 85'; Watson 64' | Stadium: Ljusseveka; Attendance: 80; Referee: Fredrik Klitte |

| 2 March 2019 Matchday 3 | IFK Norrköping (1) | 1–1 | AFC Eskilstuna (1) | Norrköping |
| 14:00 (UTC+1) | Larsson 72' | Report | Nnamani 38' | Stadium: Östgötaporten; Attendance: 1,962; Referee: Magnus Lindgren |

=== Group 3 ===
| Pos | Team | Pld | W | D | L | GF | GA | GD | Pts | Qualification | ÖIF | MFF | FFF | DIF |
|---|---|---|---|---|---|---|---|---|---|---|---|---|---|---|
| 1 | Östers IF | 3 | 3 | 0 | 0 | 7 | 3 | +4 | 9 | Advance to Knockout stage | | 2–1 | | |
| 2 | Malmö FF | 3 | 2 | 0 | 1 | 6 | 4 | +2 | 6 | | | | 2–0 | 3–2 |
| 3 | Falkenbergs FF | 3 | 1 | 0 | 2 | 3 | 5 | −2 | 3 | | 1–2 | | | 2–1 |
| 4 | Degerfors IF | 3 | 0 | 0 | 3 | 4 | 8 | −4 | 0 | | 1–3 | | | |

Updated to match(es) played on 2 March 2019. Source: Swedish Football Association
Rules for classification: 1) Points; 2) Goal difference; 3) Goals scored; 4) Head-to-head record; 5) Highest ranked team

| 17 February 2019 Matchday 1 | Malmö FF (1) | 3–2 | Degerfors IF (2) | Lund |
| 15:00 (UTC+1) | Antonsson 40'; Nielsen 71'; Gall 81' | Report | Alm 43'; Ladan 78' (pen.) | Stadium: Klostergårdens IP; Attendance: 2,283; Referee: Fredrik Klitte |

| 17 February 2019 Matchday 1 | Falkenbergs FF (1) | 1–2 | Östers IF (2) | Falkenberg |
| 15:00 (UTC+1) | Sylisufaj 79' | Report | Johannesson 32'; Pavić 65' | Stadium: Vinåvallen; Attendance: 307; Referee: Granit Maqedonci |

| 23 February 2019 Matchday 2 | Falkenbergs FF (1) | 2–1 | Degerfors IF (2) | Falkenberg |
| 16:00 (UTC+1) | Englund 78'; Mathisen 85' | Report | Björndahl 42' | Stadium: Vinåvallen; Attendance: 213; Referee: Mirza Kasic |

| 25 February 2019 Matchday 2 | Östers IF (2) | 2–1 | Malmö FF (1) | Växjö |
| 19:00 (UTC+1) | Kapčević 52'; Ahrn 89' | Report | Antonsson 54' (pen.) | Stadium: Tipshallen Växjö; Attendance: 2,055; Referee: Robert Daradic |

| 2 March 2019 Matchday 3 | Degerfors IF (2) | 1–3 | Östers IF (2) | Degerfors |
| 16:00 (UTC+1) | Björndahl 77' | Report | Ljungberg 2'; Andreasson 58'; Kapčević 67' (pen.) | Stadium: Stora Valla; Attendance: 168; Referee: Granit Maqedonci |

| 2 March 2019 Matchday 3 | Malmö FF (1) | 2–0 | Falkenbergs FF (1) | Malmö |
| 16:00 (UTC+1) | Antonsson 3'; Christiansen 41' | Report | | Stadium: Stadion; Attendance: 2,654; Referee: Mohammed Al-Hakim |

=== Group 4 ===
| Pos | Team | Pld | W | D | L | GF | GA | GD | Pts | Qualification | HIF | DFF | EIF | VAR |
|---|---|---|---|---|---|---|---|---|---|---|---|---|---|---|
| 1 | Hammarby IF | 3 | 2 | 1 | 0 | 7 | 2 | +5 | 7 | Advance to Knockout stage | | 3–1 | | 3–0 |
| 2 | Dalkurd FF | 3 | 2 | 0 | 1 | 4 | 3 | +1 | 6 | | | | | 1–0 |
| 3 | Eskilsminne IF | 3 | 0 | 2 | 1 | 2 | 4 | −2 | 2 | | 1–1 | 0–2 | | |
| 4 | Varbergs BoIS | 3 | 0 | 1 | 2 | 1 | 5 | −4 | 1 | | | | 1–1 | |

Updated to match(es) played on 4 March 2019. Source: Swedish Football Association
Rules for classification: 1) Points; 2) Goal difference; 3) Goals scored; 4) Head-to-head record; 5) Highest ranked team

| 18 February 2019 Matchday 1 | Hammarby IF (1) | 3–0 | Varbergs BoIS (2) | Stockholm |
| 19:00 (UTC+1) | Đurđić 7'; Svendsen 57'; Solheim 90+4' | Report | | Stadium: Tele2 Arena; Attendance: 11,140; Referee: Magnus Lindgren |

| 18 February 2019 Matchday 1 | Eskilsminne IF (3) | 0–2 | Dalkurd FF (2) | Helsingborg |
| 19:00 (UTC+1) | | Report | Ayaz 3'; Azizi 90' | Stadium: Olympiafältet; Attendance: 283; Referee: Mirza Kasic |

| 24 February 2019 Matchday 2 | Eskilsminne IF (3) | 1–1 | Hammarby IF (1) | Helsingborg |
| 15:00 (UTC+1) | Egger 21' | Report | Khalili 37' | Stadium: Olympiafältet; Attendance: 1,541; Referee: Per Melin |

| 24 February 2019 Matchday 2 | Dalkurd FF (2) | 1–0 | Varbergs BoIS (2) | Gävle |
| 15:00 (UTC+1) | Lawan 2' | Report | | Stadium: Gavlevallen; Attendance: 131; Referee: Farouk Nehdi |

| 4 March 2019 Matchday 3 | Varbergs BoIS (2) | 1–1 | Eskilsminne IF (3) | Varberg |
| 19:00 (UTC+1) | Book 43' | Report | Jönsson 90+2' | Stadium: Håstens IP; Attendance: 122; Referee: Andreas Johansson |

| 4 March 2019 Matchday 3 | Hammarby IF (1) | 3–1 | Dalkurd FF (2) | Stockholm |
| 19:00 (UTC+1) | Andersen 30'; Fenger 37', 86' | Report | Tranberg 6' | Stadium: Tele2 Arena; Attendance: 11,470; Referee: Viktor Wolf |

=== Group 5 ===
| Pos | Team | Pld | W | D | L | GF | GA | GD | Pts | Qualification | BKH | BP | IKB | FCR |
|---|---|---|---|---|---|---|---|---|---|---|---|---|---|---|
| 1 | BK Häcken | 3 | 3 | 0 | 0 | 11 | 1 | +10 | 9 | Advance to Knockout stage | | 1–0 | 6–1 | |
| 2 | IF Brommapojkarna | 3 | 2 | 0 | 1 | 7 | 4 | +3 | 6 | | | | 4–2 | |
| 3 | IK Brage | 3 | 1 | 0 | 2 | 7 | 12 | −5 | 3 | | | | | 4–2 |
| 4 | FC Rosengård | 3 | 0 | 0 | 3 | 3 | 11 | −8 | 0 | | 0–4 | 1–3 | | |

Updated to match(es) played on 2 March 2019. Source: Swedish Football Association
Rules for classification: 1) Points; 2) Goal difference; 3) Goals scored; 4) Head-to-head record; 5) Highest ranked team

| 16 February 2019 Matchday 1 | BK Häcken (1) | 6–1 | IK Brage (2) | Gothenburg |
| 14:00 (UTC+1) | Çelik 27', 33', 44', 57'; Friberg 45+2'; Paulinho 60' | Report | A. Lundin 54' | Stadium: Bravida Arena; Attendance: 710; Referee: Fredrik Hansson |

| 16 February 2019 Matchday 1 | FC Rosengård (4) | 1–3 | IF Brommapojkarna (2) | Malmö |
| 14:00 (UTC+1) | Sawo 55' | Report | Hellqvist 41' (pen.); Sandberg Magnusson 63', 72' | Stadium: Malmö IP; Attendance: 265; Referee: Andreas Ekberg |

| 24 February 2019 Matchday 2 | FC Rosengård (4) | 0–4 | BK Häcken (1) | Malmö |
| 15:00 (UTC+1) | | Report | Çelik 7'; Yasin 42'; Paulinho 63'; Jeremejeff 78' | Stadium: Malmö IP; Referee: Fredrik Klitte |

| 24 February 2019 Matchday 2 | IF Brommapojkarna (2) | 4–2 | IK Brage (2) | Stockholm |
| 15:00 (UTC+1) | Hellquist 50', 77', 83'; Omondi 86' | Report | A. Lundin 30'; Morsay 47' | Stadium: Grimsta IP; Referee: Fredrik Hansson |

| 2 March 2019 Matchday 3 | IK Brage (2) | 4–2 | FC Rosengård (4) | Borlänge |
| 16:00 (UTC+1) | Kamp 43', 52'; Andersen 67'; Kouakou 86' (pen.) | Report | Sakirovski 74'; Hussein 75' | Stadium: Domnarvsvallen; Attendance: 204; Referee: Farouk Nehdi |

| 2 March 2019 Matchday 3 | BK Häcken (1) | 1–0 | IF Brommapojkarna (2) | Gothenburg |
| 16:00 (UTC+1) | Jeremejeff 77' | Report | | Stadium: Bravida Arena; Attendance: 1,041; Referee: Kaspar Sjöberg |

=== Group 6 ===
| Pos | Team | Pld | W | D | L | GF | GA | GD | Pts | Qualification | HBK | ÖFK | KBK | IKS |
|---|---|---|---|---|---|---|---|---|---|---|---|---|---|---|
| 1 | Halmstads BK | 3 | 1 | 2 | 0 | 3 | 2 | +1 | 5 | Advance to Knockout stage | | | 1–1 | |
| 2 | Östersunds FK | 3 | 1 | 1 | 1 | 5 | 3 | +2 | 4 | | 0–0 | | | 3–0 |
| 3 | Karlstad BK | 3 | 1 | 1 | 1 | 5 | 5 | 0 | 4 | | | 3–2 | | 1–2 |
| 4 | IK Sirius | 3 | 1 | 0 | 2 | 3 | 6 | −3 | 3 | | 1–2 | | | |

Updated to match(es) played on 3 March 2019. Source: Swedish Football Association
Rules for classification: 1) Points; 2) Goal difference; 3) Goals scored; 4) Head-to-head record; 5) Highest ranked team

| 16 February 2019 Matchday 1 | Östersunds FK (1) | 0–0 | Halmstads BK (2) | Östersund |
| 16:00 (UTC+1) | | Report | | Stadium: Jämtkraft Arena; Attendance: 2,206; Referee: Patrik Eriksson |

| 16 February 2019 Matchday 1 | Karlstad BK (3) | 1–2 | IK Sirius (1) | Karlstad |
| 16:00 (UTC+1) | Edvardsen 90+2' | Report | Lindberg 22', 54' | Stadium: Örsholmens IP; Attendance: 485; Referee: Farouk Nehdi |

| 23 February 2019 Matchday 2 | Karlstad BK (3) | 3–2 | Östersunds FK (1) | Karlstad |
| 14:00 (UTC+1) | Selmani 45', 80'; Edvardsen 68' | Report | Islamović 39' (pen.); Hopcutt 87' | Stadium: Örsholmens IP; Attendance: 456; Referee: Viktor Wolf |

| 23 February 2019 Matchday 2 | IK Sirius (1) | 1–2 | Halmstads BK (2) | Uppsala |
| 14:00 (UTC+1) | Arvidsson 13' | Report | Karim 25', 44' | Stadium: Lötens IP; Attendance: 889; Referee: Martin Strömbergsson |

| 3 March 2019 Matchday 3 | Halmstads BK (2) | 1–1 | Karlstad BK (3) | Halmstad |
| 15:00 (UTC+1) | Karim 41' | Report | Edvardsen 56' | Stadium: Skedalaheds IP; Attendance: 621; Referee: Per Melin |

| 3 March 2019 Matchday 3 | Östersunds FK (1) | 3–0 | IK Sirius (1) | Östersund |
| 15:00 (UTC+1) | Morrison 29'; Islamović 51', 86' | Report | | Stadium: Jämtkraft Arena; Attendance: 639; Referee: Fredrik Hansson |

=== Group 7 ===
| Pos | Team | Pld | W | D | L | GF | GA | GD | Pts | Qualification | DIF | IKF | IFE | HIF |
|---|---|---|---|---|---|---|---|---|---|---|---|---|---|---|
| 1 | Djurgårdens IF | 3 | 3 | 0 | 0 | 8 | 3 | +5 | 9 | Advance to Knockout stage | | 2–1 | 3–2 | |
| 2 | IK Frej | 3 | 1 | 1 | 1 | 9 | 3 | +6 | 4 | | | | | 7–0 |
| 3 | IF Elfsborg | 3 | 1 | 1 | 1 | 8 | 5 | +3 | 4 | | | 1–1 | | |
| 4 | Hässleholms IF | 3 | 0 | 0 | 3 | 1 | 15 | −14 | 0 | | 0–3 | | 1–5 | |

Updated to match(es) played on 3 March 2019. Source: Swedish Football Association
Rules for classification: 1) Points; 2) Goal difference; 3) Goals scored; 4) Head-to-head record; 5) Highest ranked team

| 17 February 2019 Matchday 1 | Djurgårdens IF (1) | 2–1 | IK Frej (2) | Stockholm |
| 15:00 (UTC+1) | Walker 35'; Fonn Witry 50' | Report | Frithzell 59' | Stadium: Tele2 Arena; Attendance: 4,999; Referee: Glenn Nyberg |

| 17 February 2019 Matchday 1 | Hässleholms IF (4) | 1–5 | IF Elfsborg (1) | Hässleholm |
| 15:00 (UTC+1) | Wedenell 34' | Report | Nilsson 42'; Ishizaki 46', 79'; Frick 84'; Holmén 90+1' | Stadium: Österås IP; Attendance: 1,000; Referee: Robert Daradic |

| 23 February 2019 Matchday 2 | Hässleholms IF (4) | 0–3 | Djurgårdens IF (1) | Hässleholm |
| 14:00 (UTC+1) | | Report | Une Larsson 16'; Danielson 35'; Andersson 88' | Stadium: Österås IP; Attendance: 1,000; Referee: Kaspar Sjöberg |

| 23 February 2019 Matchday 2 | IF Elfsborg (1) | 1–1 | IK Frej (2) | Borås |
| 14:00 (UTC+1) | Holmén 90+5' | Report | Zeidan 37' | Stadium: Borås Arena; Attendance: 783; Referee: Johan Krantz |

| 3 March 2019 Matchday 3 | IK Frej (2) | 7–0 | Hässleholms IF (4) | Täby |
| 15:00 (UTC+1) | Gerbino Polo 11', 62', 89'; Zeidan 29', 52'; Hudu 58'; Ekdal 71' | Report | | Stadium: Vikingavallen; Attendance: 108; Referee: Robert Daradic |

| 3 March 2019 Matchday 3 | Djurgårdens IF (1) | 3–2 | IF Elfsborg (1) | Stockholm |
| 15:00 (UTC+1) | Karlström 47'; Radetinac 54'; Kozica 90+1' | Report | Fonn Witry 12' (o.g.); Cibicki 56' | Stadium: Tele2 Arena; Attendance: 6,526; Referee: Kristoffer Karlsson |

=== Group 8 ===
| Pos | Team | Pld | W | D | L | GF | GA | GD | Pts | Qualification | GAIS | ÖSK | IFKG | NBIS |
|---|---|---|---|---|---|---|---|---|---|---|---|---|---|---|
| 1 | GAIS | 3 | 2 | 0 | 1 | 8 | 5 | +3 | 6 | Advance to Knockout stage | | | | 4–3 |
| 2 | Örebro SK | 3 | 1 | 1 | 1 | 5 | 5 | 0 | 4 | | 2–1 | | 3–3 | |
| 3 | IFK Göteborg | 3 | 1 | 1 | 1 | 5 | 6 | −1 | 4 | | 0–3 | | | |
| 4 | Nyköpings BIS | 3 | 1 | 0 | 2 | 4 | 6 | −2 | 3 | | | 1–0 | 0–2 | |

Source: Swedish Football Association
Rules for classification: 1) Points; 2) Goal difference; 3) Goals scored; 4) Head-to-head record; 5) Highest ranked team

| 16 February 2019 Matchday 1 | Örebro SK (1) | 2–1 | GAIS (2) | Örebro |
| 16:00 (UTC+1) | Björnquist 15'; Bertilsson 70' | Report | Östling 77' | Stadium: Behrn Arena; Attendance: 1,003; Referee: Mohammed Al-Hakim |

| 17 February 2019 Matchday 1 | Nyköpings BIS (3) | 0–2 | IFK Göteborg (1) | Nyköping |
| 15:00 (UTC+1) | | Report | Wikström 25'; Ohlsson 85' | Stadium: Rosvalla IP; Attendance: 927; Referee: Andreas Johansson |

| 24 February 2019 Matchday 2 | Nyköpings BIS (3) | 1–0 | Örebro SK (1) | Nyköping |
| 15:00 (UTC+1) | Romero 56' | Report | | Stadium: Rosvalla IP; Attendance: 417; Referee: Adam Ladebäck |

| 25 February 2019 Matchday 2 | IFK Göteborg (1) | 0–3; Awarded | GAIS (2) | Gothenburg |
| 19:00 (UTC+1) | | Report | | Stadium: Bravida Arena; Referee: Glenn Nyberg |

| 3 March 2019 Matchday 3 | GAIS (2) | 4–3 | Nyköpings BIS (3) | Gothenburg |
| 17:00 (UTC+1) | Bohm 14'; Hamidović 54' (pen.), 71'; Ašćerić 61' | Report | Burman 23'; Romero 33'; Alp 50' | Stadium: Bravida Arena; Attendance: 976; Referee: Nermin Cisic |

| 3 March 2019 Matchday 3 | Örebro SK (1) | 3–3 | IFK Göteborg (1) | Örebro |
| 17:00 (UTC+1) | Prodell 28' (pen.); Bertilsson 35'; Björnquist 39' | Report | Prodell 30' (o.g.); Wernersson 69'; Karlsson Lagemyr 86' | Stadium: Behrn Arena; Attendance: 783; Referee: Patrik Eriksson |

== Knockout stage ==
=== Qualified teams ===
| Pos | Grp | Team | Pld | W | D | L | GF | GA | GD | Pts | Qualification |
|---|---|---|---|---|---|---|---|---|---|---|---|
| 1 | 5 | BK Häcken | 3 | 3 | 0 | 0 | 11 | 1 | +10 | 9 | Seeded in Quarter-final draw |
| 2 | 7 | Djurgårdens IF | 3 | 3 | 0 | 0 | 8 | 3 | +5 | 9 | Seeded in Quarter-final draw |
| 3 | 3 | Östers IF | 3 | 3 | 0 | 0 | 7 | 3 | +4 | 9 | Seeded in Quarter-final draw |
| 4 | 2 | AFC Eskilstuna | 3 | 2 | 1 | 0 | 9 | 1 | +8 | 7 | Seeded in Quarter-final draw |
| 5 | 4 | Hammarby IF | 3 | 2 | 1 | 0 | 7 | 2 | +5 | 7 | Unseeded in Quarter-final draw |
| 6 | 1 | AIK | 3 | 2 | 1 | 0 | 3 | 1 | +2 | 7 | Unseeded in Quarter-final draw |
| 7 | 8 | GAIS | 3 | 2 | 0 | 1 | 8 | 5 | +3 | 6 | Unseeded in Quarter-final draw |
| 8 | 6 | Halmstads BK | 3 | 1 | 2 | 0 | 3 | 2 | +1 | 5 | Unseeded in Quarter-final draw |

Source: Group results
Rules for classification: 1) Points; 2) Goal difference; 3) Goals scored; 4) Ranking in 2018 season

=== Bracket ===
Quarter-finals
10 March – Stockholm
Djurgårdens IF (p) | 0 (4)
Hammarby IF | 0 (2)
9 March – Gothenburg
BK Häcken | 4
GAIS | 1
9 March – Växjö
Östers IF | 2
AIK (a.e.t.) | 4
10 March – Eskilstuna
AFC Eskilstuna (a.e.t.) | 2
Halmstad BK | 1

Semi-finals
16 March – Stockholm
Djurgårdens IF | 2
BK Häcken (a.e.t.) | 3
17 March – Stockholm
AIK | 1 (5)
AFC Eskilstuna (p) | 1 (6)

Final
30 May – Gothenburg
BK Häcken | 3
AFC Eskilstuna | 0

=== Quarter-finals ===
| 9 March 2019 | BK Häcken (1) | 4–1 | GAIS (2) | Gothenburg |
| 14:00 (UTC+1) | Jeremejeff 20'; Paulinho 56' (pen.); Andersson 62'; Toivio 80' | Report | Pllana 83' | Stadium: Bravida Arena; Attendance: 3,440; Referee: Kristoffer Karlsson |

| 9 March 2019 | Östers IF (2) | 2–4 (a.e.t.) | AIK (1) | Växjö |
| 16:00 (UTC+1) | Kapčević 42', 64' (pen.) | Report | Larsson 7'; Sundgren 85' (pen.); Obasi 98', 109' | Stadium: Myresjöhus Arena; Attendance: 2,835; Referee: Kaspar Sjöberg |

| 10 March 2019 | Djurgårdens IF (1) | 0–0 (a.e.t.) (4–2 p) | Hammarby IF (1) | Stockholm |
| 15:00 (UTC+1) | | Report | | Stadium: Tele2 Arena; Attendance: 20,750; Referee: Glenn Nyberg |
| | Penalties |
| | Walker (penalty missed); Danielson (penalty scored); Ulvestad (penalty scored); Karlström (penalty scored); Fonn Witry (penalty scored) | | Andersen (penalty missed); Fenger (penalty scored); Đurđić (penalty missed); Tanković (penalty scored) |

| 10 March 2019 | AFC Eskilstuna (1) | 2–1 (a.e.t.) | Halmstads BK (2) | Eskilstuna |
| 17:00 (UTC+1) | Ali 28'; Jarl 117' | Report | Karim 51' | Stadium: Tunavallen; Attendance: 487; Referee: Mohammed Al-Hakim |

=== Semi-finals ===
| 16 March 2019 | Djurgårdens IF (1) | 2–3 (a.e.t.) | BK Häcken (1) | Stockholm |
| 18:15 (UTC+1) | Danielson 13'; Buya Turay 38' | Report | Mohammed 34'; Jeremejeff 60'; Çelik 109' | Stadium: Tele2 Arena; Attendance: 8,434; Referee: Glenn Nyberg |

| 17 March 2019 | AIK (1) | 1–1 (a.e.t.) (5–6 p) | AFC Eskilstuna (1) | Stockholm |
| 18:15 (UTC+1) | Dimitriadis 55' | Report | Larsson 82' (o.g.) | Stadium: Friends Arena; Attendance: 8,731; Referee: Stefan Johannesson |
| | Penalties |
| | Larsson (penalty scored); Elyounoussi (penalty scored); Goitom (penalty missed); Obasi (penalty missed); Ylätupa (penalty scored); Adu (penalty scored); Linnér (penalty scored); Rashidi (penalty missed) | | Hodzic (penalty scored); Loeper (penalty missed); Avdić (penalty scored); Bernal (penalty scored); Kojic (penalty missed); Kamara (penalty scored); Jarl (penalty scored); Michel (penalty scored) |

=== Final ===
30 May 2019
15:00

| BK Häcken (1) | 3–0 | AFC Eskilstuna (1) |
|---|---|---|
| Faltsetas 10' (Irandust); Toivio 76' (Andersson); Lundberg | Report |

Bravida Arena, Gothenburg
Attendance: 4,958
Referee: Kristoffer Karlsson
