= 2021 Svenska Cupen final =

Svenska Cupen Final 2021

- Event: 2020–21 Svenska Cupen
| Hammarby IF | BK Häcken |
| 0 | 0 |
- Hammarby IF won 5–4 on penalties
- Date: 30 May 2021
- Venue: Tele2 Arena, Stockholm
- Referee: Kaspar Sjöberg
- Attendance: 0

== Teams ==
| Team | Previous finals appearances (bold indicates winners) |
|---|---|
| Hammarby IF | 3 (1976–77, 1982–83, 2010) |
| BK Häcken | 3 (1990, **2016**, **2019**) |

== Route to the final ==
Note: In all results below, the score of the finalist is given first.(H: home, A: away)

| Hammarby IF | | Round | BK Häcken | |
|---|---|---|---|---|
| Opponent | Result | Qualifying stage | Opponent | Result |
| Bye | | Round 1 | Bye | |
| FC Gute | 5–0 (A) | Round 2 | Angered BK | 3–1 (A) |
| Opponent | Result | Group stage | Opponent | Result |
| AFC Eskilstuna | 4–1 (H) | Matchday 1 | Dalkurd FF | 2–0 (H) |
| Oskarshamns AIK | 3–0 (A) | Matchday 2 | IK Gauthiod | 3–0 (A) |
| AIK | 3–2 (H) | Matchday 3 | Helsingborgs IF | 1–1 (H) |
| **Group 8 winner**: Pos / Team / Pld / Pts; **1** / Hammarby IF / **3** / **9**; 2 / AIK / 3 / **6**; 3 / AFC Eskilstuna / 3 / **3**; 4 / Oskarshamns AIK / 3 / **0**; Updated to match(es) played on 7 March 2021. Source: SFA | | Final standings | **Group 3 winner**: Pos / Team / Pld / Pts; **1** / BK Häcken / **3** / **7**; 2 / Dalkurd FF / 3 / **6**; 3 / Helsingborgs IF / 3 / **2**; 4 / IK Gauthiod / 3 / **1**; Updated to match(es) played on 7 March 2021. Source: SFA | |
| Opponent | Result | Knockout stage | Opponent | Result |
| Trelleborgs FF | 3–2 (H) (a.e.t.) | Quarter-finals | IFK Norrköping | 3–2 (A) |
| Djurgårdens IF | 1–0 (A) | Semi-finals | Västerås SK | 3–0 (H) |

== Match ==
=== Details ===
30 May 2021
14:30

| Hammarby IF | 0–0 (a.e.t.) | BK Häcken |
|---|---|---|
| | Report |
Penalties
| Paulinho (penalty scored); Accam (penalty scored); Fenger (penalty scored); Sher (penalty scored); Selmani (penalty scored) | 5–4 | Faltsetas (penalty scored); Bengtsson (penalty scored); Toivio (penalty scored); Traoré (penalty missed); Youssef (penalty scored) |

Tele2 Arena, Stockholm
Attendance: 0
Referee: Kaspar Sjöberg

| **Hammarby IF** | **BK Häcken** |

Assistant referees:
Mikael Hallin
Niclas Ivarsson
Fourth official:
Victor Wolf

**Match rules**

=== Statistics ===
| Overall | Hammarby IF | BK Häcken |
|---|---|---|
| Goals scored | 0 | 0 |
| Total shots | 17 | 15 |
| Shots on target | 10 | 9 |
| Ball possession | 53% | 47% |
| Corner kicks | 5 | 3 |
| Yellow cards | 7 | 2 |
| Red cards | 1 | 1 |
| Attacks | 91 | 72 |
| Dangerous Attacks | 68 | 34 |

== See also ==
- 2020–21 Svenska Cupen
