= Rasmus Lindgren =

Swedish footballer

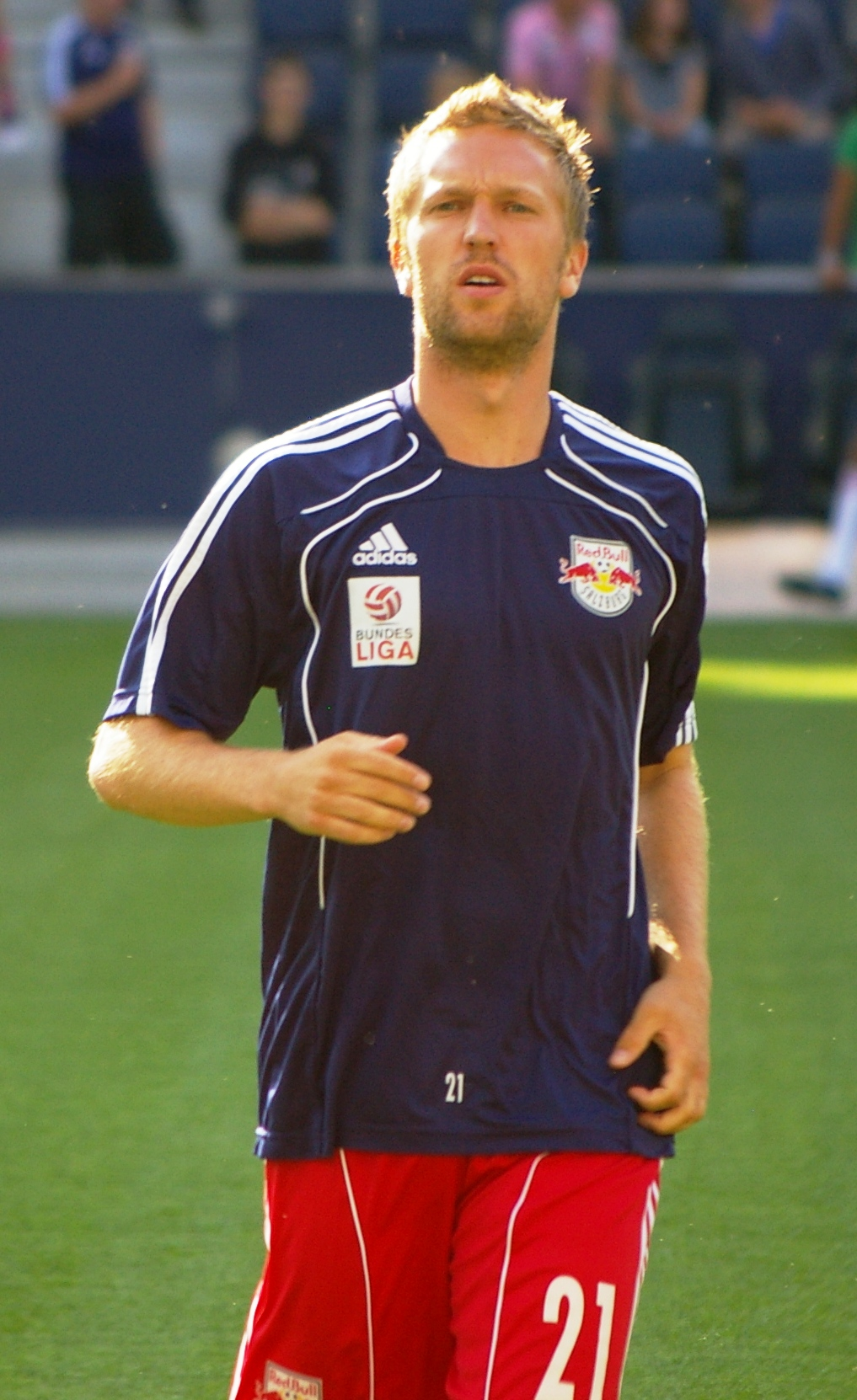
- Lindgren training for Red Bull Salzburg in 2011

Personal information
- Date of birth: 29 November 1984 (age 41)
- Place of birth: Landskrona, Sweden
- Height: 1.80 m (5 ft 11 in)
- Positions: Centre-back; defensive midfielder

Team information
- Current team: BK Häcken (assistant)

Youth career
- 2002–2003: Landskrona BoIS
- 2003–2005: Ajax

Senior career*
Years	Team	Apps	(Gls)
2005	Ajax	4	(0)
2005–2008	FC Groningen	82	(4)
2008–2011	Ajax	54	(6)
2011–2012	Red Bull Salzburg	20	(1)
2013–2016	FC Groningen	86	(6)
2016–2021	BK Häcken	107	(1)

International career
2002–2002	Sweden U19	9	(0)
2004–2006	Sweden U21	9	(0)
2008–2009	Sweden	2	(0)

Managerial career
- 2022–2023: BK Häcken (U19)
- 2024–: BK Häcken (assistant)
- * Club domestic league appearances and goals

Rasmus Lindgren (born 29 November 1984) is a Swedish former professional footballer who played as a defender and midfielder. He started off his footballing career at Landskrona BoIS, but spent most of his career in the Netherlands, representing AFC Ajax and FC Groningen, and also had a short stint in Austria with Red Bull Salzburg. He retired at BK Häcken in the Swedish Allsvenskan in 2021. A full international between 2008 and 2009, he won two caps for the Sweden national team.

== Club career ==
=== Landskrona ===
Lindgren was born in Landskrona and started his footballing career at Landskrona BoIS' youth academy, alongside future professional footballers such as Pontus Farnerud, Alexander Farnerud, Jonas Olsson, and Johan Andersson. He progressed through the club's youth system and contributed the achievements at Landskrona. Lindgren sat on the bench in an Allsvenskan game against Örebro SK in 2003 as an unused substitute, but never made his senior debut for the team.

=== Ajax ===
On 6 January 2003, Eredivisie side Ajax was impressed with his performance and offered him a professional contract following a trial. It was announced on 17 January 2003 that he signed a one–year contract with the club.

After joining Ajax, Lindgren was assigned to the club's second team for the next two years. A year later on 24 March 2004, he signed a one–year contract extension with the club. Ahead of the 2004–05 season, Lindgren was promoted to the club's first team squad, having called up to Ajax's training squad. Following this, Lindgren returned to the Ajax's second team. However, lack of first team opportunities at the club led him to consider his future at Ajax. Shortly after, he was called up to the club's first team squad. Lindgren made his debut for Ajax, in the 1–2 away win in the Eredivisie against NAC Breda on 13 February 2005. After the match, Lindgren says he is happy to make his debut and expected to make his way into the first team. Three days later, on 16 February 2005, Lindgren made his European debut, coming on as a 78th-minute substitute, in a 1–0 win against Auxerre in the first leg of the UEFA Cup Round of 32. In the return leg, however, the club lost 3–1 on aggregate, eliminating the club from the tournament. Following this, he was offered a new contract by Ajax, which believed to be a three–year contract. However, Lindgren failed to secure a place in the starting line-up, as he played four matches at the end of the 2004–05 season.

=== FC Groningen ===
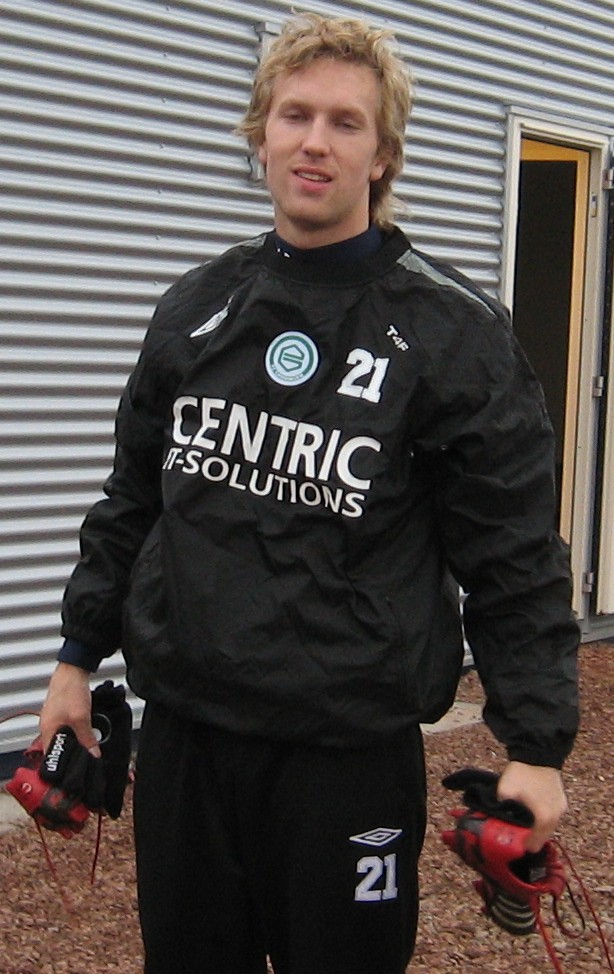
Lindgren on the training field of Groningen in 2006

On 9 August 2005 it was announced that Lindgren would join FC Groningen for a 1-year loan period.

He made his debut for the club, coming on as a 33rd-minute substitute for the injured Erik Nevland and played for the rest of the game, in a 1–0 win against RBC Roosendaal in the opening game of the season. In a follow–up match, Lindgren scored his first goal for FC Groningen, in a 2–1 loss against RKC Waalwijk. His second goal for the club came on 29 January 2006, in a 3–2 win against NAC Breda. For his performance, he was named Man of the Man by the supporters on the club's website. On 1 March 2006 it was announced that Lindgren would sign a new deal, making him a FC Groningen player for four years, with the transfer fee reportedly to have cost €300,000. His third goal for the club came on 12 April 2006, in a 2–1 win against FC Utrecht. He then played in both legs of the league's play–offs spot for the UEFA Champions League for FC Groningen by beating AZ Alkmaar 4–3 on aggregate. However, Lindgren, once again, played in both legs of the league's play–offs spot for the UEFA Champions League against his former club, Ajax, as the club lost 3–2, resulting in FC Groningen failed to qualify for the UEFA Champions League. Having established himself in the starting eleven for the side, he went on to make forty appearances and scoring three times in all competitions.

At the start of the 2006–07 season, Lindgren continued to establish himself in the starting eleven, playing in the midfield position. He scored his first goal of the season, in a 2–1 win against TOP Oss in the second round of the KNVB Beker on 20 September 2006. In a match against Excelsior on 25 October 2006, Lindgren sent up the club's first goal of the game, but was sent–off for a professional foul on Sieme Zijm in the 81st minute, as FC Groningen won 2–1. After the match, he was given a one match suspension, but the suspension was overturned, due to lack of evidence. Following this, Lindgren contributed three more assists for FC Groningen throughout the 2006–07 season. Despite being sidelined on four occasions during the 2006–07 season, he went on to make thirty–four appearances and scoring once in all competitions.

At the start of the 2007–08 season, Lindgren continued to establish himself in the first team, playing in the midfield position. Between 22 December 2007 and 29 December 2007, he played an important role for FC Groningen when he set up three goals and earning a goal himself, coming against PSV Eindhoven on 26 December 2007. Despite missing two matches in the first half of the 2007–08 season, Lindgren went on to make twenty–four appearances and scoring once in all competitions. During his total 2 1/2-year stay at FC Groningen, he became one of the most important players in the squad, playing a total of 82 Eredivisie-matches and scoring 4 goals.

=== Return to Ajax ===
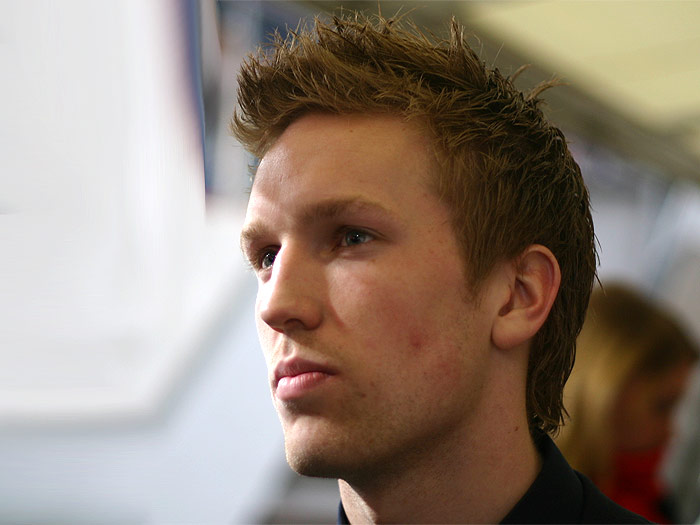
Lindgren pictured during his time at his second spell at Ajax in 2008

On 28 January 2008, Lindgren moved back to Ajax, signing a 3 1/2-year deal, joining his teammate, Bruno Silva. The transfer fee was about €2.5 million. His first club, Landskrona, would not be entitled to compensation as part of his transfer move.

He made his debut for the club, starting the whole game, against rivals, Feyenoord on 3 February 2008 and set up a goal for Klaas-Jan Huntelaar, who scored twice, in a 3–0 win. Two weeks later on 15 February 2008, Lindgren scored his first goal for Ajax, as well as, setting up the club's two other goals, in a 6–2 win against Sparta Rotterdam. However, he suffered a hamstring injury that saw him sustained the same injury earlier this month and missed one match. Following his return, Lindgren started in the remaining six league matches for the club. He then scored his second goal for Ajax, in a 2–1 win against his former club, FC Groningen on 16 April 2008. Lindgren played in both legs against SC Heerenveen in the play–offs for the UEFA Champions League spot, as the club won 5–2 on aggregate. He, once again, played in both legs against FC Twente in the play–offs for the UEFA Champions League spot, as Ajax lost 2–1 on aggregate, resulting in the club failing to qualify for the UEFA Champions League next season. At the end of the 2007–08 season, Lindgren went on to make eleven appearances and scoring two times in all competitions. For his performance, Voetbal International named him Team of the Season.

At the start of the 2008–09 season, Lindgren continued to remain as a regular first team player, playing in the midfield position. He scored his first goal of the season, in a 2–0 win against FC Twente on 1 November 2008. A month later, Lindgren captained Ajax in a match against NAC Breda on 12 December 2008 and scored his second goal of the season, in a 3–0 win. However, he suffered a hamstring injury while training and was sidelined for a month. Although Lindgren recovered, he returned to the first team on 8 February 2009, coming on as a second-half substitute, in a 4–1 loss against SBV Vitesse. Following this, Lindgren made six starts between 15 February 2009 and 8 March 2009. However, during a 2–1 loss against Marseille in the first leg of the UEFA Europa League Last Sixteen, he suffered a concussion and was substituted in the 22nd minute. After the match, Lindgren was taken to the hospital and was sidelined for weeks. Because of his absent, he was no longer used as a vice–captain and was replaced by Thomas Vermaelen. Lindgren returned to the first team on 12 April 2009 when he came on as a 57th-minute substitute, in a 7–0 win against Willem II. At the end of the 2008–09 season, Lindgren went on to make thirty–two appearances and scoring two times in all competitions.

Ahead of the 2009–10 season, Lindgren had to have an operation on his left foot shortly before the end of last season. Although he recovered from his injury, Lindgren, however, was not one hundred percent fit. He was included in Ajax's friendly match against Ajax Cape Town on 4 July 2009 and played in the first half before being substituted, as the club won 3–2. However, since returning from injury, Lindgren found his first team opportunities limited, under the management of head-coach Martin Jol. This led to him discuss his future at Ajax, but he wanted to stay at the club to fight for his place in the first team. Lindgren made his first team appearance on 22 September 2009 when he started and played 120 minutes against AZ Alkmaar in the second round of the KNVB Beker, as Ajax lost 2–0. Lindgren spent the rest of the year, playing for the club's reserve team. With his first team opportunities limited, Lindgren was expected to leave Ajax in the January transfer window. But in mid–January, he was called up to the club's first team for the first time in three months. Lindgren scored his first goal of the season, in a 1–1 draw against NAC Breda on 17 January 2010. Following this, he was told by Manager Jol to stay at Ajax. Lindgren appeared in the next five matches for the club. However, during a match against SC Heerenveen on 13 February 2010, he suffered a knee injury and was substituted at half time, as Ajax won 2–0. Following this, Lindgren did not play for the rest of the 2009–10 season, due to injuries. While absent, the club won the KNVB Cup after beating rivals, Feyenoord, 6–3 on aggregate. At the end of the 2009–10 season, he went on to make eight appearances and scoring once in all competitions.

Ahead of the 2010–11 season, Lindgren said he wanted to stay at Ajax despite having new competitions in the midfield position. In the beginning of the 2010–11 season, Lindgren scored an important goal against PAOK in the UEFA Champions League Third qualifying round helping the club to move to the Play-off round, ultimately leading to qualification to the Group stage. However, he suffered a muscle injury and then a knee injury that saw him out for a month. By early September, Lindgren had recovered from a knee injury and made his return to the first team against rivals, Feyenoord on 19 September 2010, starting the whole game, in a 2–1 win. Nine days later on 28 September 2010, he made his UEFA Champions League debut, coming on as a 79th-minute substitute, in a 1–1 draw against A.C. Milan. Prior to the match, Lindgren suffered a minor knee complaints but was included in the squad, though he was on the substitute bench as a result. Since recovering from a knee injury, Lindgren made eight starts for Ajax in the next two months. During which, he scored his first goal of the season, in a 4–1 win against Heracles Almelo on 30 October 2010. This lasted until Lindgren was sent–off at the last minute of the game for a foul on Ibrahim Afellay, as Ajax drew 0–0 against rivals, PSV Eindhoven on 20 November 2010. After the match, he served a two match suspension. Lindgren returned to the first team on 8 December 2010 against Milan in the UEFA Champions League match, coming on as an 82nd-minute substitute, in a 2–0 win. However, following his return from suspension, the situation did not change in the next season under new head-coach Frank de Boer and found his playing time, mostly from the substitute bench, as well as, his own injury concerns. Despite this, Lindgren's contributions to the club saw Ajax win the league. At the end of the 2010–11 season, he went on to make twenty–six appearances and scoring two times in all competitions.

Following this, Lindgren announced in Swedish media that he's leaving Ajax, citing new challenges. Upon announcing his intention of leaving the club, Lindgren was linked a move to European clubs, including clubs from his homeland country.

=== Red Bull Salzburg ===
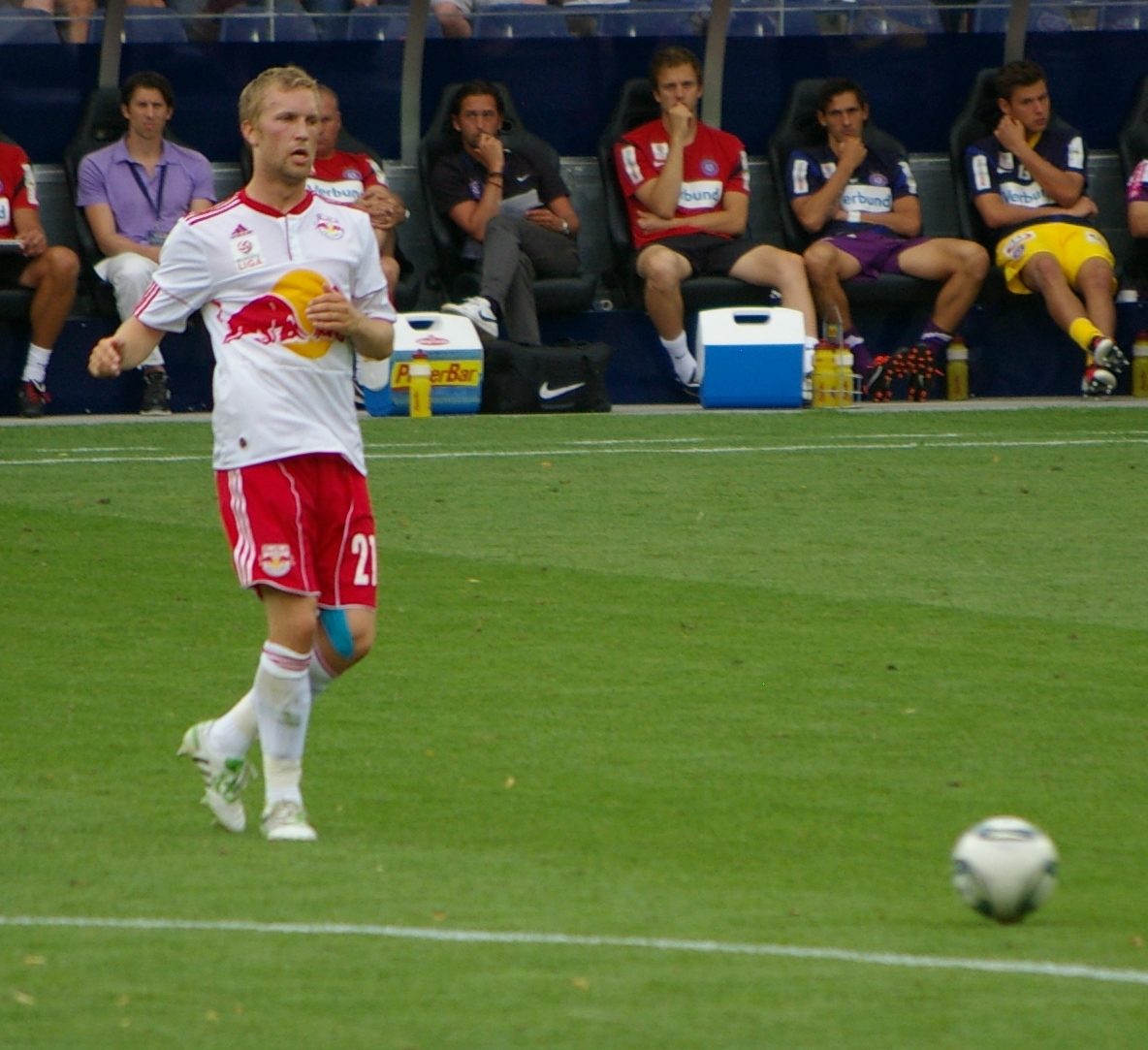
Rasmus Lindgren in his first league match for Red Bull Salzburg

On 20 June 2011, it was announced that Lindgren would join Red Bull Salzburg on a two-year deal starting from the 2011–12 season. It came after when the Austrian club saw the necessity in him to rebuild the squad.

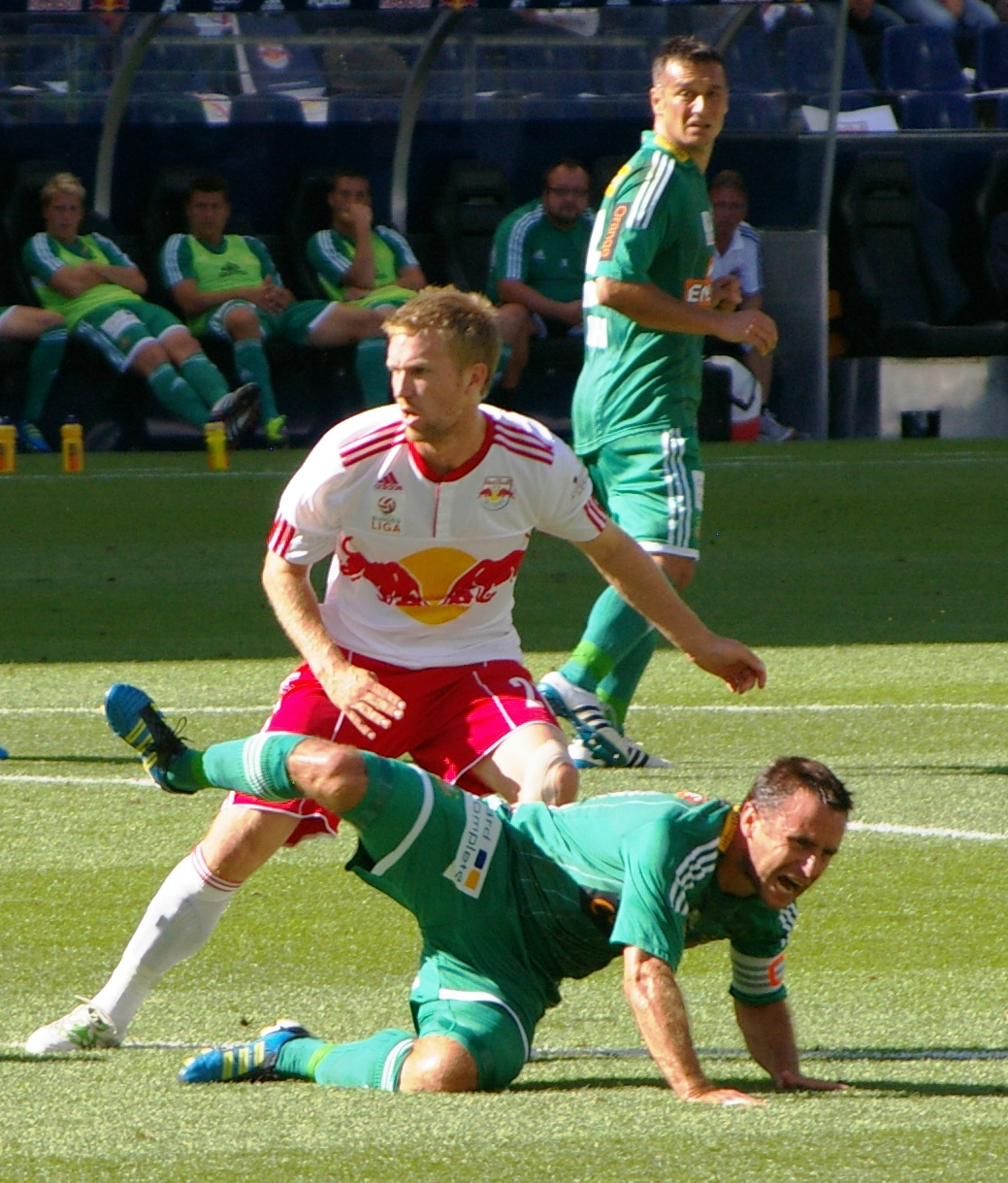
Lindgren looks on as Steffen Hofmann is fouled during a match between Rapid Wien and Red Bull Salzburg.

He made his debut for the club, starting the whole game, in a 4–1 win against Liepājas Metalurgs in the first leg of the UEFA Europa League Second Qualifying Round. Three days later on 17 July 2011, Lindgren made his league debut in the opening game of the season against Austria Wien, starting the whole game in defensive midfield position, winning 2–0. However, he missed the return of the UEFA Europa League Second Qualifying Round against Liepājas Metalurgs, due to a groin injury, as Red Bull Salzburg drew 0–0 to progress to the next round. Lindgren returned to the starting line–up against FC Wacker Innsbruck on 24 July 2011, only to be sent–off for the second bookable offence in the last game, as the club won 1–0. He played in both legs of the UEFA Europa League Play–Off Round against AC Omonia, as Red Bull Salzburg went through to the group stage following a 2–2 draw on aggregate, thanks to away goal. Since joining the club, Lindgren was involved in the first team, rotating in either playing in the defensive midfield position and centre–back position. Lindgren scored his first goal in a 4–0 win over SAK Klagenfurt in the second round of Austrian Cup on 21 September 2011. He later scored his second goal for the club, in a 2–2 draw against Admira Wacker Mödling on 24 March 2012. Lindgren then set up one of the goals for Red Bull Salzburg, as the club won 5–1 win against Admira Wacker Mödling on 13 May 2012, securing in winning the league. As the 2011–12 season progressed, he found himself out of the starting line–up, resulting in him being dropped to the substitute bench or injury concern and was even on the substitute bench, which saw Red Bull Salzburg winning the Austrian Cup. In his first season at the club, Lindgren went on to make thirty–four appearances and scoring two times in all competitions.

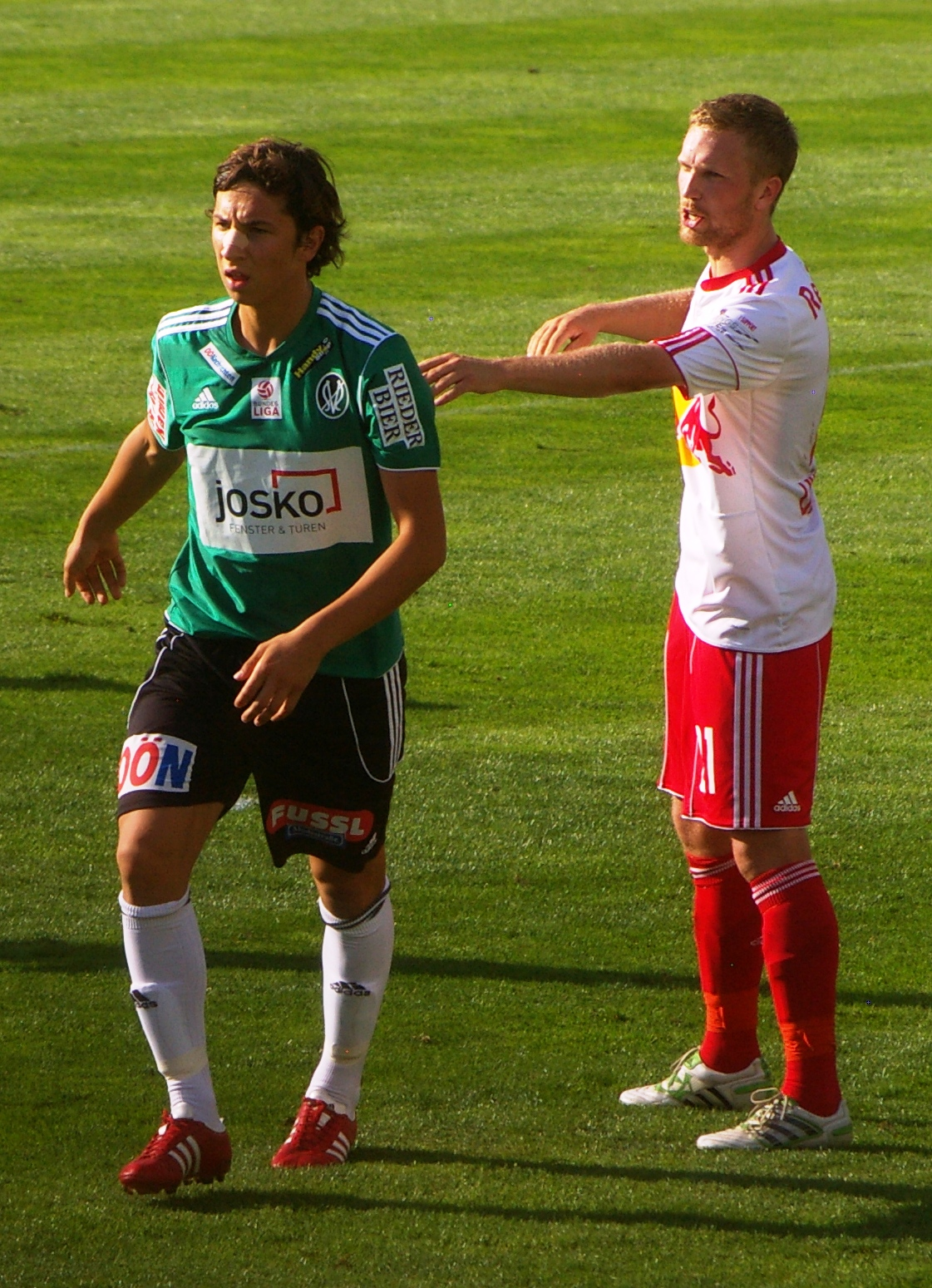
Lindgren about to mark a SV Ried's player during a match between SV Ried and Red Bull Salzburg

At the start of the 2012–13 season, Lindgren made two appearances in all competitions for Red Bull Salzburg. However, he was in the club's squad, leading up to his departure from Red Bull Salzburg on 26 September 2012. It came after when Lindgren took legal action against the club. It was revealed that personal matters was another reason for his release. Lindgren later reflected about his departure from Red Bull Salzburg, saying: "A bunch of Germans came in, Ralf Rangnick took over as director of the club and a German coach came, it was a Dutch coach who took me there. If you have some connections to Holland and have played there, it is clear that it benefits you as a player. A bunch of Germans came in and replaced everything and sent down six men in the B-team, they told me that I had one year left on the contract and that they wanted to invest entirely in young players. Okay, I thought. It turned out that you were not allowed to do that as a club. I heard from the players' association, you were not allowed to do that. Then they contacted the club and said that they could either buy me out or put me in the A-team again. Then they chose to buy me out in the autumn."

=== Return to Groningen ===
In late November, it was announced that Lindgren would make a return to the Netherlands, re-joining FC Groningen on a three-year deal, though he was unable to make his debut until January.

After the move, Lindgren said he was pleased to make his return to Groningen, though he is keen to make a return to Scandinavia. Having been unveiled, Lindgren started training with the club and new teammates.

On 20 January 2013, he made his second debut in FC Groningen's starting line-up, playing 83 minutes before being substituted, in a 2–0 loss to Utrecht. After the match, Lindgren said he was disappointed with his comeback match. Since re–joining the club, Lindgren established himself in the first team, playing in the defensive midfield position. FC Groningen finished in seventh place, albeit 19 points behind Twente whom they faced in the play-offs. He played in both legs of the play–offs against the opposition team, as the club lost 4–2 on aggregate, resulting in FC Groningen would not qualify for the Europa League next season. Despite missing two matches through suspension later in the 2012–13 season, Lindgren went on to make sixteen appearances in all competitions.

Ahead of the 2013–14 season, FC Groningen announced that Lindgren would be the club's new captain following the departure of Kees Kwakman. He started and captained FC Groningen's first six league matches of the season, helping the club earn eight points. This lasted until Lindgren suffered a hip injury that saw him miss one match. He returned to the first team against FC Twente on 29 September 2013, coming on as a 66th-minute substitute, in a 5–0 loss. Since returning to the first team, however, Lindgren found his playing time in the first team from the substitute bench. He returned as captain on 12 February 2014 against FC Twente, starting the whole game, as FC Groningen drew 1–1. By March, Lindgren regained his first team place, playing in the defensive midfield position once again. Lindgren played four times in the league's play–offs, as he helped the club qualify for the UEFA Europa League next season. Despite suffering another injury later in the 2013–14 season, Lindgren went on to make twenty–five appearances in all competitions.

At the start of the 2014–15 season, Lindgren played in both legs of the second round of the UEFA Europa League against Aberdeen, as the club lost 2–1 on aggregate. He appeared in the first five league matches of the season before being sent–off for a second bookable offence, in a 3–0 loss against SC Cambuur on 14 September 2014. After serving a one match suspension, Lindgren returned to the starting line–up against BVV Barendrecht in the second round of the KNVB Cup, as he helped FC Groningen win 4–1. However, since returning from injury, Lindgren found his playing time, mostly coming from the substitute bench for the next four months. He return to the starting line–up on 14 February 2015 against Excelsior, captaining the whole game, in a 1–1 draw. Following this, Lindgren began playing in the centre–back position and played for the rest of the 2014–15 season. He then scored his first goal for the club, in a 1–1 draw against SBV Vitesse on 4 April 2015. Four days later on 8 April 2015, Lindgren helped FC Groningen reach the final of the KNVB Cup after the club beat Excelsior 3–0 in the semi-finals. Lindgren helped the Green-White Army win the 2014–15's KNVB Cup against defending champions PEC Zwolle 2–0, winning their first major trophy and qualifying for the UEFA Europa League next season. At the end of the 2014–15 season, he went on to make thirty appearances and scoring once in all competitions.

Ahead of the 2015–16 season, Lindgren resumed his duty as FC Groningen's captain following the departure of Maikel Kieftenbeld. He captained the club's first two matches of the season, including a 2–0 loss against PSV Eindhoven in the Johan Cruyff Shield. However, Lindgren suffered ankle injury while training and missed three matches as a result. He made his return on 2 September 2015 against VV Pelikaan-S in a friendly match, starting the whole game, in a 5–0 win. Since returning from injury, Lindgren was featured in the club's four matches, as well as, retaining his captaincy. However, he suffered ankle injury once again and was sidelined for the rest of the year. Lindgren made his return from injury on 8 January 2016 against Oostende in a friendly match, as FC Groningen won 1–0. Following his return, he resumed his first team place, playing in the centre–back position, as well as, his captaincy for the rest of the 2015–16 season. Lindgren then scored his first goal of the season, in a 1–0 win against ADO Den Haag on 3 April 2016, to end the club's six matches without a win. This was followed up by scoring his second goal of the season, in a 3–1 win against De Graafschap. A month later on 8 May 2016, he scored twice against Heracles Almelo in the last game of the season, as FC Groningen won 2–1. Four days later on 12 May 2016 against Heracles Almelo in the first leg of the league's semi-final play–off spot for the UEFA Europa League, Lindgren scored once again, as the club won 2–1, in what turned out to be his last appearance for FC Groningen. However, he missed the return leg due to a knee injury and because of his absent, the club lost 5–1 in the return leg, resulting FC Groningen missing out a place in the UEFA Europa League next season. At the end of the 2015–16 season, Lindgren went on to make twenty–four appearances and scoring five times in all competitions.

Following this, it was announced on 21 March 2016 that Lindgren would be leaving FC Groningen at the end of the 2015–16 season, with a return move to Sweden as his preferred destination.

=== BK Häcken ===
==== 2016 season ====
In May 2016 Lindgren signed with the Allsvenskan side BK Häcken, marking his first professional club in Sweden and his return to his country in fourteen years.

He made his debut for the club, starting the whole game and kept a clean sheet, in a 0–0 draw against Örebro in a league game. This was followed up by keeping another clean sheet against Helsingborg, winning 2–0. Since joining BK Häcken, Lindgren quickly established himself in the first team, playing in the centre–back position. However, during a 3–2 win against Hammarby on 22 September 2016, he suffered a concussion after colliding with opposition player Pa Dibba in the 63rd minute that saw substituted. After the match, it was announced that Lindgren would be out for several weeks. He made his return to the first team on 16 October 2016 against Jönköpings Södra IF, starting the whole game, in a 1–1 draw. At the end of the 2016 season, Lindgren went on to make fourteen appearances in all competitions.

==== 2017 season ====
Ahead of the 2017 season, it was announced that Lindgren was appointed as new captain of BK Häcken. However, he suffered a broken nose during a friendly match, which saw the club lost 3–2 against Molde on 4 February 2017. After the match, Lindgren was taken to the hospital and made a recovery. He captained his first match as captain for BK Häcken, starting the whole game, in a 1–1 draw against Örebro in the group stage of Svenska Cupen. A week later on 12 March 2017, Lindgren scored his first goal for the club, in a 3–0 win against AIK in the quarter–finals of Svenska Cupen. Lindgren helped BK Häcken keep two consecutive clean sheets in the first two league matches against AIK and Djurgårdens IF. However, during a 4–0 win against IFK Göteborg on 2 May 2017, he received a straight red card in the 45th minute. After the match, it was announced that Lindgren was suspended for two matches. He made his return to the first team on 17 May 2017 against Halmstad and scored his second goal for the club, in a 2–1 win. Since returning from suspension, Lindgren continued to regain his first team place in the centre–back position throughout the 2017 season, eventually helping BK Häcken finish fourth place in the league. He scored his third goal of the season, in a 9–1 win against Kvibille in the second round of the Svenska Cupen. Lindgren, once again, helped the club keep two consecutive clean sheets on two separate occasions; the first one occurred between 10 September 2017 and 16 September 2017 and the second one occurred between 1 October 2017 and 14 October 2017. At the end of the 2017 season, Lindgren went on to make thirty–one appearances and scoring three times in all competitions.

==== 2018 season ====
At the start of the 2018 season, Lindgren continued to regain his first team place in the centre–back position, as well as, his captaincy. He helped the club keep two consecutive clean sheets in three separate occasions between February and May. However, in a match against AIK on 23 May 2018, Lindgren suffered a knee injury that saw him substituted in the 40th minute, as BK Häcken drew 1–1. After the match, it was announced that he would be sidelined for a month. But he made his return to the first team against GIF Sundsvall on 7 July 2018 and set up one of the goals, in a 3–0 win. Lindgren was featured in the next five matches for the club until he missed one match, due to suspension. Lindgren returned to the starting line–up from suspension against Djurgårdens IF on 12 August 2018 and helped BK Häcken keep a clean sheet, in a 5–0 win. This was followed up by keeping two clean sheets in a row against GIF Sundsvall and IF Brommapojkarna. Following this, he continued to regain his first team place for the rest of the 2018 season. Lindgren, once again, kept consecutive clean sheets for the club between 21 October 2018 and 27 October 2018 against Östersund and Dalkurd. At the end of the 2018 season, he went on to make twenty–nine appearances in all competitions.

==== 2019 season ====
At the start of the 2019 season, Lindgren continued to regain his first team place in the centre–back position, as well as, his captaincy. He then set up the club's only goal of the game, in a 1–0 win against GIF Sundsvall on 5 May 2019. After the match, Lindgren was named Team of the Week for his performance. However, he missed the next three matches, due to illness. Lindgren made his return to the first team against IFK Göteborg on 24 May 2019, as BK Häcken lost 2–1. Six days later on 30 May 2019, Lindgren won his first silverware with the club when he played the full 90 minutes as BK Häcken won the 2018–19 Svenska Cupen, beating AFC Eskilstuna 3–1 in the final. It was announced on 13 September 2019 that Lindgren signed a contract with the club, keeping him until 2021. He previously stated his desire to stay at the club and beyond. At the end of the 2019 season, Lindgren made thirty–five appearances in all competitions.

==== 2020 season ====
At the start of the 2020 season, Lindgren appeared two times in BK Häcken's Svenska Cupen matches, keeping two clean sheets against GAIS and Östersunds. However, due to the pandemic, the season was pushed back to three months. He later spoke out the club's decision to lay off players, saying: "Everyone agrees to do this, everyone understands the seriousness of the situation and the consequences of it. How hard it hits the club. We all belong to BK Häcken and know what sacrifices many make to support the association in a difficult situation. If we can help in any way, we want to do it. We want the club to feel good. At the same time, we know how much more it will help the club on the day we can be short-term laid off, so we hope that the agreement will be in place as soon as possible." Once the league resumed behind closed doors, Lindgren continued to regain his first team place in the centre–back position, as well as, his captaincy. He then played a role against IK Sirius on 22 June 2020, setting up two goals, in a 2–2 draw. Lindgren followed up by helping BK Häcken keep three consecutive clean sheets in the next three matches between 29 June 2020 and 5 July 2020. He later rotated into playing in the defensive midfield position for two matches between 28 October 2020 and 1 November 2020. This was followed up by scoring his first goal for the club, in a 2–1 win against Östersund. Lindgren helped BK Häcken finish third place in the league following a 0–0 draw against Kalmar in the last game of the season. Despite missing three matches later in the 2020 season, Lindgren went on to make twenty–nine appearances and scoring once in all competitions.

== International career ==
=== Youth career ===
In March 2002, Lindgren was called up to the Sweden U18 for the first time. He made his debut for the U18 national team, coming on as a 71st-minute substitute, in a 1–0 loss against Slovakia U18 on 22 April 2002. Lindgren later appeared twice for the Sweden U18 in the Slovakia Cup, as the U18 national team won the tournament. In August 2002, he was called up to the Sweden U19 for the first time. Lindgren added three more appearances for the U19 national team to combine nine appearances for both Sweden U18 and U19.

In April 2004, Lindgren was called up to the Sweden U21 squad for the first time. He made his debut for the U21 national team, starting the whole game, as they lost 2–0 against Croatia U21 on 27 April 2004. In June 2004, Lindgren was included in the Sweden U21 squad for the Toulon Tournament. He played three times in the Toulon Tournament, as the U21 national team lost in the final. Lindgren was called up to the Sweden U21 in March 2005 but did not play. He made his next appearance for the U21 national team until on 16 August 2006 against Macedonia U21, starting in a 3–1 win. Lindgren played three more times for Sweden U21 by the end of the year. Lindgren went on to make nine appearances for the U21 national team.

=== Senior career ===
On 29 January 2008, Lindgren was called up to the Sweden for the first team ahead of the match against Turkey. However, he was dropped from the squad after suffering a thigh injury while training. Three months, Lindgren was put on the standby list for the Sweden squad ahead of the UEFA Euro 2008 tournament.

Following this, he did not receive another call up from the national team until on 12 August 2008, but did not play. After being called up once more, Lindgren made his debut for Sweden on 19 November 2008, in a 3–1 defeat to the Netherlands. He made his second international appearance in a 2–0 defeat to Serbia. Despite making only making two international appearances for the national team, Lindgren reflected, saying: "I have never been so interested in being part of the national team. It has never been important to me. The clubs I have played in have been so important to me. I have thought that it would have been fun if the national team had come, but it has never been a thing that I have been upset about. I have not felt that it has been so important to me. But without feeling that it had not been fun, I had thought it was great fun. But I got to play two international matches."

== Personal life ==
Lindgren has two siblings. His father, Bernt Göran Lindgren, is a former professional ice hockey player. Lindgren later said in an interview that he considered Netherlands to be his second home. Growing up, Lindgren was friends with teammate Alexander Farnerud.

Lindgren is married and together, they have two children. Lindgren announced his intention to move to coaching once his playing time would come to an end.

== Career statistics ==
=== Club ===
As of 30 August 2017

Appearances and goals by club, season and competition
Club	Season	League			Cup (Note: Includes KNVB Cup, Austrian Cup, and Svenska Cupen.)		Europe		Other		Total	
Club	Season	Division	Apps	Goals	Apps	Goals	Apps	Goals	Apps	Goals	Apps	Goals
Ajax	2004–05	Eredivisie	4	0	–		1	0	0	0	5	0
FC Groningen	2005–06	Eredivisie	32	3	4	0	0	0	4	0	40	3
FC Groningen	2006–07	Eredivisie	30	0	2	1	2	0	0	0	34	1
FC Groningen	2007–08	Eredivisie	20	1	2	0	2	0	0	0	24	1
FC Groningen	Total		82	4	8	1	4	0	4	0	98	5
Ajax	2007–08	Eredivisie	11	2	0	0	0	0	0	0	11	2
Ajax	2008–09	Eredivisie	22	2	2	0	8	0	0	0	32	2
Ajax	2009–10	Eredivisie	6	1	1	0	0	0	0	0	7	1
Ajax	2010–11	Eredivisie	15	1	2	0	7	1	0	0	24	2
Ajax	Total		54	6	5	0	15	1	0	0	74	7
Red Bull Salzburg	2011–12	Austrian Bundesliga	20	1	3	1	11	0	0	0	34	2
Red Bull Salzburg	2012–13	Austrian Bundesliga	0	0	1	0	1	0	0	0	2	0
Red Bull Salzburg	Total		20	1	4	1	12	0	0	0	36	2
FC Groningen	2012–13	Eredivisie	14	0	0	0	–		2	0	16	0
FC Groningen	2013–14	Eredivisie	21	0	0	0	–		4	0	25	0
FC Groningen	2014–15	Eredivisie	23	1	5	0	2	0	0	0	30	1
FC Groningen	2015–16	Eredivisie	21	4	0	0	1	0	2	1	24	5
FC Groningen	Total		79	5	5	0	3	0	8	1	95	6
BK Häcken	2016	Allsvenskan	14	0	3	1	–		0	0	17	1
BK Häcken	2017	Allsvenskan	18	1	3	1	–		0	0	21	2
BK Häcken	Total		32	1	6	2	0	0	0	0	38	3
Career total			287	17	28	4	35	1	12	1	374	23

=== International ===
Appearances and goals by national team and year
National team	Year	Apps	Goals
Sweden	2008	1	0
Sweden	2009	1	0
Total		2	0

== Honours ==
Ajax

- Eredivisie: 2010–11
- KNVB Cup: 2009–10

Red Bull Salzburg

- Austrian Bundesliga: 2011–12
- Austrian Cup: 2011–12

Groningen

- KNVB Cup: 2014–15

BK Häcken

- Svenska Cupen: 2018–19
