= Alexis Bbakka =

Footballer (born 1995)

Personal information
- Full name: Alexis David Bbakka
- Date of birth: 13 September 1995 (age 31)
- Place of birth: Sweden
- Height: 1.82 m (6 ft 0 in)
- Position: Forward

Youth career
- 2012–2013: Simba
- 2013–2014: Kampala JT Rwenshama

Senior career*
Years	Team	Apps	(Gls)
2014–2015	Sufstars	31	(22)
2015–2017	Tenhults	35	(21)
2017–2019	Umeå	52	(20)
2019–2020	Carlstad United	23	(13)
2020–2023	Umeå	50	(7)
2023–2024	Rosengård		

International career
2019	Uganda	2	(0)
- * Club domestic league appearances and goals as of 13:18, 10 July 2023 (UTC)

Alexis David Bbakka (born 13 September 1995) is a professional footballer who plays as a forward. Born in Sweden, he has played for the Uganda national team.

== International career ==
Bbakka made his debut for Uganda in a 0–0 friendly draw against Turkmenistan on 9 June 2019. His first competitive match was 0–0 draw against Burkina Faso in Africa Cup of Nations qualification on 13 November 2019.

== Personal life ==
Born in Sweden but representing Uganda internationally, Bbakka has nationality for both countries.
