= Moses Waiswa =

Ugandan footballer (born 1997)

Personal information
- Full name: Moses Waiswa Ndhondhi
- Date of birth: 20 April 1997 (age 29)
- Place of birth: Kampala, Uganda
- Position: Attacking midfielder

Team information
- Current team: Kampala Capital City Authority

Senior career*
Years	Team	Apps	(Gls)
2016	Växjö United		
2017–2020	Vipers		
2020–2022	SuperSport United	29	(0)
2022–	Kampala Capital City Authority		

International career^{‡}
2017–	Uganda	11	(1)
- * Club domestic league appearances and goals as of 21:05, 22 August 2020 (UTC) ‡ National team caps and goals as of 14:26, 5 August 2019 (UTC)

Moses Waiswa Ndhondhi (born 20 April 1997) is a Ugandan international footballer who plays for Kampala Capital City Authority, as an attacking midfielder.

== Club career ==
Born in Kampala, he has played club football for Växjö United and Vipers. He signed for Vipers in January 2017. He won the 2017–18 Uganda Premier League with the club. In January 2020 he signed for South African club SuperSport United. On 25 January 2020 he made his debut for SuperSport United against Chippa United. He returned to Uganda with Kampala Capital City Authority in 2022.

== International career ==
He made his international debut for Uganda in 2017. He scored on his debut after receiving a call-up to the national team, which he said came to him as a surprise.

== Honours ==
- 2017–18 Uganda Premier League
