= Joona Toivio =

Finnish footballer (born 1988)

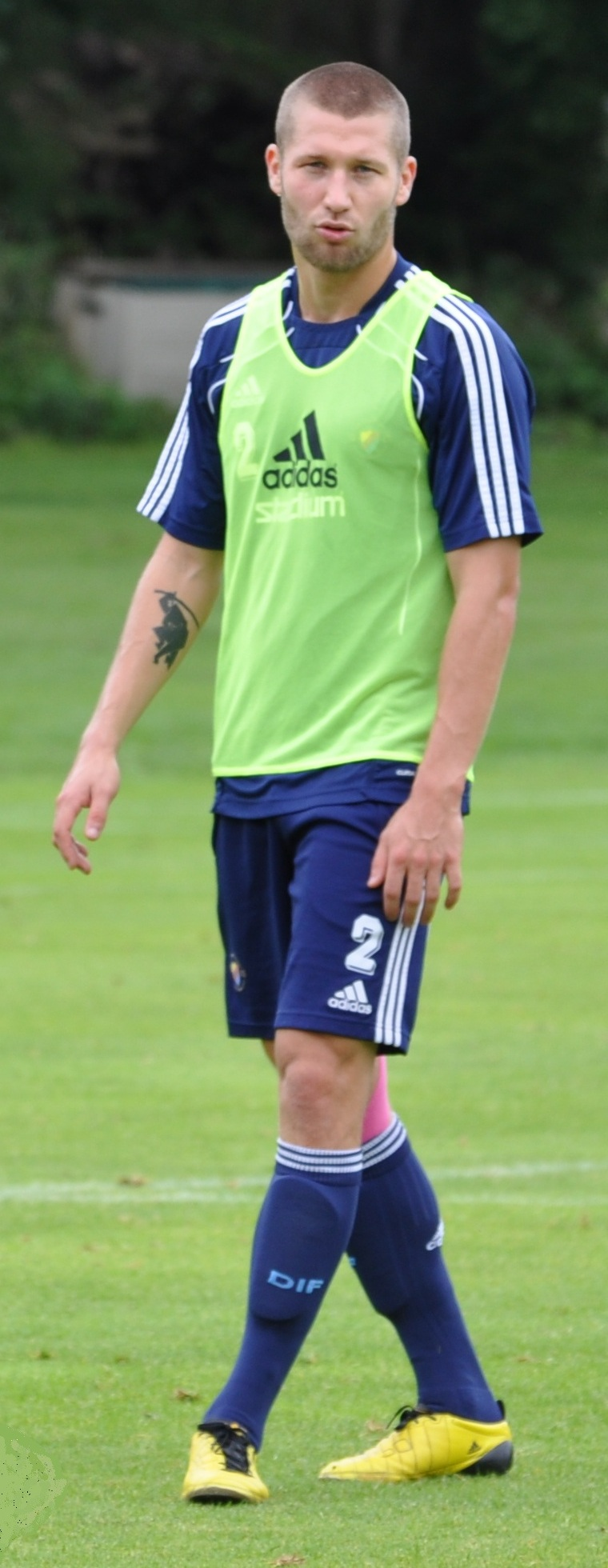
- Toivio with Djurgården in 2010

Personal information
- Full name: Joona Marko Aleksi Toivio
- Date of birth: 10 March 1988 (age 38)
- Place of birth: Sipoo, Finland
- Height: 1.86 m (6 ft 1 in)
- Position: Centre-back

Youth career
- SibboV
- HJK
- AZ

Senior career*
Years	Team	Apps	(Gls)
2006	Klubi 04	1	(0)
2007–2009	AZ	0	(0)
2008–2009	→ Telstar (loan)	53	(0)
2010–2013	Djurgården	87	(9)
2013–2017	Molde	89	(12)
2018	Termalica Nieciecza	9	(1)
2018–2021	Häcken	95	(4)
2022–2024	HJK	48	(2)
2025	KTP	28	(0)

International career
	Finland U21	7	(0)
2011–2021	Finland	78	(3)
- * Club domestic league appearances and goals as of 10 May 2026

Joona Marko Aleksi Toivio (born 10 March 1988) is a Finnish former professional footballer who played as a centre-back. Toivio was a core defender of the Finland national team during 2011–2021.

He has previously played for Klubi 04, AZ, Telstar, Molde, Djurgården, Termalica Nieciecza, BK Häcken, HJK Helsinki and KTP

== Early life ==
Toivio's parents have worked as foster parents, and Toivio had many siblings while growing up.

== Club career ==
=== Early career ===
Earlier in his career, he was training with HJK's first team before he had a trial at Manchester United. Though this proved unsuccessful, he later signed for AZ. He did not make a single appearance during his two years with AZ, and had a loan spell with Telstar before he decided to move to Swedish side Djurgårdens IF in January 2010.

=== Molde ===
On 13 March 2013, Toivio signed for Norwegian side Molde, as a replacement for Vegard Forren who had moved to Southampton. The transfer fee was reported to be €500,000.

On 23 November 2013, he was an unused substitute as Molde defeated Rosenborg in the 2013 Norwegian Football Cup Final by a score of 4–2. Molde would reach the final of the Norwegian Cup the following year as well, and this time Toivio started the match as Molde once again were crowned champions, with a 2–0 win over Odd.

=== Häcken ===
In 2018, after leaving on a bosman from Termalica Nieciecza, Joona Toivio signed for Swedish side Häcken. He made his competitive debut for the club on 19 August 2018 in a 2–0 away victory over Sundsvall, registering an assist on Alexander Jeremejeff's 54th-minute goal.

On 30 May 2019, Toivio scored for Häcken in the 2019 Svenska Cupen Final, a convincing 3–0 victory over AFC Eskilstuna.

During the 2020 Allsvenskan season, Tovio played every minute for Häcken as the club finished in third place and qualified for the Europa Conference League second qualifying round. Häcken reached the 2021 Svenska Cupen Final where they faced Hammarby at the Tele2 Arena on 30 May 2021. After finishing 0–0 after extra time, the match went to penalty-kicks; Toivio converted his kick but Häcken fell 4–5 in the shoot-out with the solitary miss coming from Bénie Traoré.

=== HJK ===
On 1 November 2021, he signed a three-year contract with HJK beginning in 2022.

=== KTP ===
On 17 January 2025, Toivio joined newly promoted Veikkausliiga club KTP for the 2025 season.

== International career ==
Toivio was the captain of the under-21 team, for whom he played in both midfield and in defense.

Since his senior debut in 2011, Toivio has been capped over 70 times for Finland.

In June 2021, Toivio was selected to the final 26-man squad for the rescheduled UEFA Euro 2020 tournament. It was Finland's first appearance in a major tournament. Toivio started the nation's first match, a 1–0 win over Denmark in Copenhagen on 12 June. The game was overshadowed and initially suspended by the on-field collapse and cardiac arrest of Danish midfielder Christian Eriksen. He played in two other group stage matches as well.

Toivio announced his retirement from international football after 2022 FIFA World Cup qualification match against France on 16 November 2021, along with fellow centre-back Paulus Arajuuri.

== Career statistics ==
=== Club ===
As of match played on 12 December 2024.

Club	Season	Division	League		Domestic cups (Note: Includes KNVB Cup, Svenska Cupen, Norwegian Cup, Suomen Cup and Finnish League Cup)		Europe		Total	
Club	Season	Division	Apps	Goals	Apps	Goals	Apps	Goals	Apps	Goals
Klubi 04	2006	Ykkönen	1	0	0	0	—		1	0
AZ Alkmaar	2007–08	Eredivisie	0	0	0	0	—		0	0
Telstar (loan)	2008–09	Eerste Divisie	37	0	2	0	—		39	0
Telstar (loan)	2009–10	Eerste Divisie	16	0	1	0	—		17	0
Telstar (loan)	Total		53	0	3	0	—		56	0
Djurgården	2010	Allsvenskan	29	1	1	0	—		30	1
Djurgården	2011	Allsvenskan	28	6	2	0	—		30	6
Djurgården	2012	Allsvenskan	30	2	2	0	—		32	2
Djurgården	Total		87	9	5	0	—		92	9
Molde	2013	Tippeligaen	16	4	2	0	6 (Note: Four appearances in UEFA Champions League, two appearances in UEFA Europa League)	0	24	4
Molde	2014	Tippeligaen	22	1	7	1	4 (Note: Appearances in UEFA Europa League)	1	33	3
Molde	2015	Tippeligaen	22	2	4	0	14 (Note: Four appearances in UEFA Champions League, ten appearances in UEFA Europa League)	0	40	2
Molde	2016	Tippeligaen	17	4	2	0	—		19	4
Molde	2017	Eliteserien	12	1	3	0	—		15	1
Molde	Total		89	12	18	1	24	1	131	14
Bruk-Bet Termalica Nieciecza	2017–18	Ekstraklasa	9	1	0	0	—		9	1
Häcken	2018	Allsvenskan	12	0	5	2	—		17	2
Häcken	2019	Allsvenskan	28	2	4	2	2	0	34	4
Häcken	2020	Allsvenskan	30	1	5	0	—		35	1
Häcken	2021	Allsvenskan	25	1	1	0	1 (Note: Appearances in UEFA Europa Conference League)	0	27	1
Häcken	Total		95	4	14	4	3	0	112	8
HJK	2022	Veikkausliiga	11	0	3	0	1	0	15	0
HJK	2023	Veikkausliiga	19	1	7	0	11 (Note: Appearances in UEFA Champions League, UEFA Europa League and UEFA Europa Conference League)	1	37	2
HJK	2024	Veikkausliiga	18	1	4	0	6 (Note: Two appearances in UEFA Champions League, four appearances in UEFA Conference League)	0	28	1
HJK	Total		48	2	14	0	18	1	80	3
KTP	2025	Veikkausliiga	0	0	2	0	–		2	0
Career total			382	28	56	5	45	2	482	35

=== International ===
As of match played on 16 November 2021.

Finland
Year	Apps	Goals
2011	8	1
2012	8	0
2013	7	1
2014	7	0
2015	4	0
2016	5	0
2017	3	0
2018	11	1
2019	12	0
2020	5	0
2021	8	0
Total	78	3

=== International goals ===
Scores and results list Finland's goal tally first.

#	Date	Location	Opponent	Score	Result	Competition
1.	7 October 2011	Helsinki Olympic Stadium, Helsinki, Finland	Sweden	1–2	1–2	UEFA Euro 2012 qualification
2.	26 March 2013	Stade Josy Barthel, Luxembourg City, Luxembourg	Luxembourg	3–0	3–0	Friendly
3.	11 January 2018	Zayed Sports City Stadium, Abu Dhabi, United Arab Emirates	Jordan	1–0	2–1	Friendly

== Honours ==
Molde

- Eliteserien: 2014
- Norwegian Cup: 2013, 2014

BK Häcken

- Svenska Cupen: 2018–19; runner-up: 2020–21

HJK

- Veikkausliiga: 2022, 2023
- Finnish League Cup: 2023
