= Mervan Çelik =

Swedish footballer (born 1990)

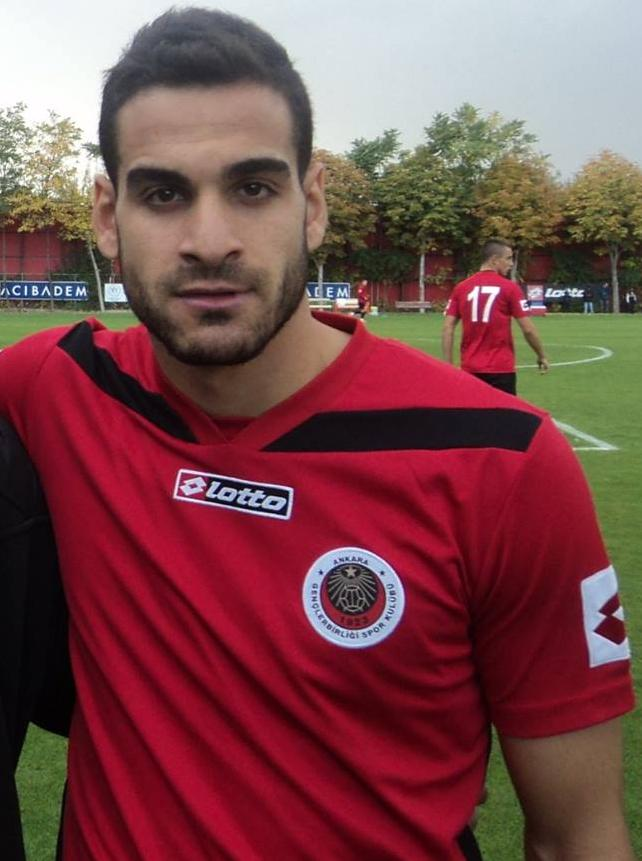

Personal information
- Full name: Mervan Çelik
- Date of birth: 26 May 1990 (age 36)
- Place of birth: Hisingen, Sweden
- Height: 1.78 m (5 ft 10 in)
- Position: Winger

Youth career
- 2001–2004: IF Warta
- 2004–2006: BK Häcken
- 2007–2008: GAIS

Senior career*
Years	Team	Apps	(Gls)
2008–2012	GAIS	68	(18)
2012	Rangers	5	(0)
2012	GAIS	14	(2)
2012–2013	Pescara	23	(4)
2013–2015	Gençlerbirliği	42	(6)
2015–2017	Akhisar Belediyespor	12	(0)
2017–2019	BK Häcken	33	(2)
2019	Fatih Karagümrük	10	(2)
2020	GAIS	23	(4)
2021–2022	Amed	25	(9)
2022–2024	GAIS	71	(15)

International career
2008–2009	Sweden U19	6	(2)
2011–2012	Sweden U21	14	(6)
- * Club domestic league appearances and goals as of 13 November 2024

Mervan Çelik (born 26 May 1990) is a Swedish former professional footballer who played as a winger. He previously played for GAIS, Rangers, Pescara, Gençlerbirliği, Akhisar Belediyespor, Häcken, and Fatih Karagümrük. He represented Sweden at youth international level.

== Club career ==
=== GAIS ===
Çelik played for IF Warta and BK Häcken at youth level before joining GAIS in 2007. "I started as a striker but now I play as an inner midfielder and winger. It does not matter if I play on the right or the left, both positions work for me," he said in an interview on the club's website. Çelik made his competitive début against GIF Sundsvall in the Allsvenskan on 20 July 2008, and appeared in the starting eleven for the first time six weeks later against IFK Göteborg. He signed a three-year contract in May 2009, and scored his first goal for the club later that year against Kalmar FF.

=== Rangers ===
Having left GAIS at the end of his contract, Çelik was offered a three-and-a-half-year contract from Scottish Premier League team Rangers, which he signed on 20 January 2012. After Rangers went into administration, Çelik chose to leave the club in March 2012 without a pay-off. He stated that he didn't make the wrong decision in joining the club, but the club entering administration was unpredictable.

GAIS claimed that Rangers owed them £240,000 compensation for the transfer of Celik. However, there were suggestions that Celik was not offered a new contract within 60 days before the end of his previous deal, meaning that no compensation would have been necessary. Both GAIS and Celik disputed this and the club have threatened to take the matter to FIFA if Rangers don't pay them.

=== Return to GAIS ===
After leaving Rangers in March 2012, Çelik signed an eight-month contract with GAIS.

=== Pescara ===
Çelik continued his career in Italian first league with the newcomer Pescara in 2012. He scored the first goal for Pescara the 2012–13 season against Sampdoria in a 3–2 loss.

== International career ==
Çelik has represented Sweden at youth level. He made his under-21 debut against Norway on 2 June 2011 and scored two goals in a 4–1 win. He is eligible to play for Turkey through his parents.

== Career statistics ==
=== Club ===
As of match played 10 November 2024

Appearances and goals by club, season and competition
Club	Season	League			National cup (Note: Includes Svenska Cupen, Scottish Cup, Coppa Italia, Turkish Cup)		Continental		Other		Total	
Club	Season	Division	Apps	Goals	Apps	Goals	Apps	Goals	Apps	Goals	Apps	Goals
GAIS	2008	Allsvenskan	10	0	0	0	—		—		10	0
GAIS	2009	Allsvenskan	6	1	1	0	—		—		7	1
GAIS	2010	Allsvenskan	27	3	2	0	—		—		29	3
GAIS	2011	Allsvenskan	27	14	2	0	—		—		29	14
GAIS	Total		70	18	5	0	—		—		75	18
Rangers	2011-12	Scottish Premier League	5	0	1	0	0	0	0	0	6	0
GAIS	2012	Allsvenskan	14	2	0	0	—		—		14	2
Pescara	2012-13	Serie A	23	4	1	0	—		—		24	4
Gençlerbirliği	2013-14	Süper Lig	20	2	2	0	—		—		22	2
Gençlerbirliği	2014-15	Süper Lig	27	5	9	2	—		—		36	7
Gençlerbirliği	Total		47	7	11	2	—		—		58	9
Akhisarspor	2015-16	Süper Lig	5	0	8	4	—		—		13	4
Akhisarspor	2016-17	Süper Lig	7	0	5	0	—		—		12	0
Akhisarspor	Total		12	0	13	4	—		—		25	4
BK Häcken	2017	Allsvenskan	1	0	1	0	—		—		2	0
BK Häcken	2018	Allsvenskan	21	1	3	4	3 (Note: Appearance(s) in UEFA Europa League)	1	—		27	6
BK Häcken	2019	Allsvenskan	11	1	6	6	0	0	—		17	7
BK Häcken	Total		33	2	10	10	3	1	—		46	13
Fatih Karagümrük	2019-20	TFF 1. Lig	9	1	2	1	—		—		11	2
GAIS	2020	Superettan	23	4	3	1	—		—		26	5
Amed	2021-22	TFF 2. Lig	25	9	1	0	—		2 (Note: Appearance(s) in TFF 2. Lig Promotion play-offs)	0	28	9
GAIS	2022	Ettan	16	5	1	2	—		—		17	7
GAIS	2023	Superettan	29	10	4	1	—		—		33	11
GAIS	2024	Allsvenskan	26	0	3	0	—		—		29	0
GAIS	Total		71	15	8	3	—		—		79	18
Career total			332	62	55	21	3	1	2	0	392	84

== Honours ==
BK Häcken

- Svenska Cupen 2018–19

== Personal life ==
Çelik was born and raised in the suburb Biskopsgården, Hisingen, an island which forms part of the Gothenburg Municipality. Çelik's parents are ethnic Kurds from Turkey. His mother and father lived in Konya before moving to Sweden, where his father opened a restaurant.
