= Tobias Englund =

Swedish association football player

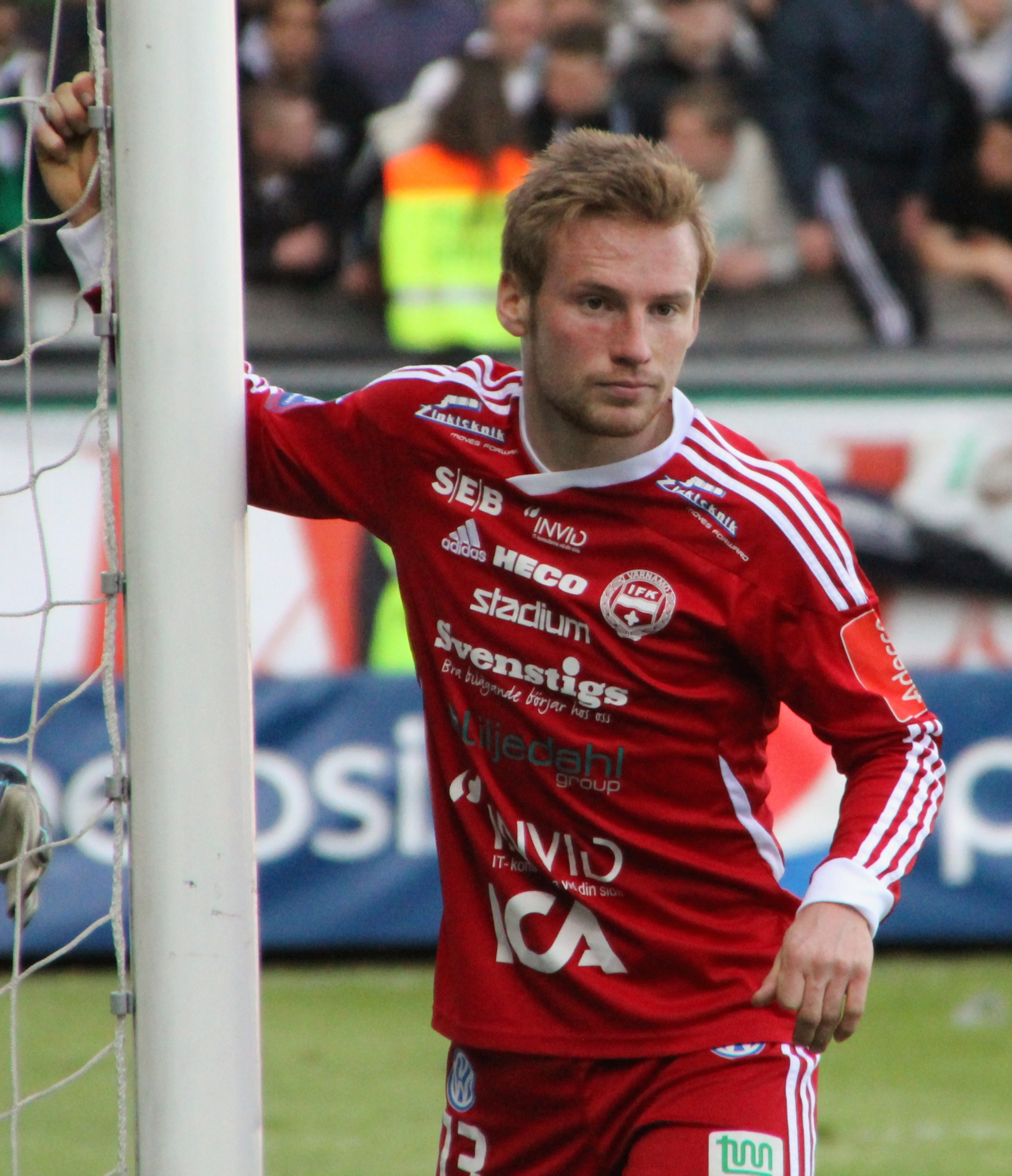
- Englund in 2013

Personal information
- Full name: Tobias Klas Anders Englund
- Date of birth: 6 February 1989 (age 37)
- Height: 1.74 m (5 ft 9 in)
- Position: Left-back

Team information
- Current team: IFK Värnamo (youth coach)

Youth career
- IFK Värnamo

Senior career*
Years	Team	Apps	(Gls)
2005–2016	IFK Värnamo	179	(9)
2017–2021	Falkenberg	117	(10)
2022	Arendal	27	(2)
- * Club domestic league appearances and goals

Tobias Klas Anders Englund (born 6 February 1989) is a Swedish retired footballer who played as a left-back.

== Career ==
Englund started at IFK Värnamo and played for the A team between 2005 and 2016. In January 2017, Englund was recruited by Falkenbergs FF on a two-year contract. In November 2018, Englund extended his contract by two years. On 31 March 2019 Englund made his Allsvenskan debut for Falkenbergs against Örebro SK. In March 2022, he signed a contract with Norwegian club Arendal.

After leaving Arendal at the end of 2022, Englund returned to Sweden, and started as a coach at the academy of his former club, IFK Värnamo.
