= Oscar Karlsson =

Swedish footballer

Personal information
- Full name: Oscar Tomas Karlsson
- Date of birth: 23 January 1992 (age 34)
- Place of birth: Sweden
- Height: 1.77 m (5 ft 9 1/2 in)
- Position: Midfielder

Team information
- Current team: Nyköpings BIS
- Number: 21

Youth career
- IFK Norrköping
- Stigtomta IF
- Nyköpings BIS

Senior career*
Years	Team	Apps	(Gls)
2011–2013	Nyköpings BIS	62	(14)
2012–2013	→ Nyköpings BIS 2	6	(2)
2014–2015	Gefle IF	3	(0)
2015	Nyköpings BIS	9	(1)
2016	IK Brage	23	(3)
2017–	Nyköpings BIS	26	(10)
- * Club domestic league appearances and goals as of 30 November 2017 (UTC)

Oscar Karlsson (born 23 January 1992) is a Swedish footballer who plays for Nyköpings BIS as a midfielder.
