= Växjö United FC =

Swedish football club

- Full name: Växjö United Football Club
- Founded: 2011
- League: Division 3
- Website: http://www.vaxjounited.se/

Växjö United Football Club is a Swedish football club based in Växjö that competes in Division 3. The club has also competed in the Svenska Cupen.

In the past, the club was called Sufstars FC.

== Notable players ==
- (Uganda) Alexis Bbakka
- (Uganda) Moses Waiswa
