= Paulinho Guerreiro =

Brazilian footballer (born 1986)

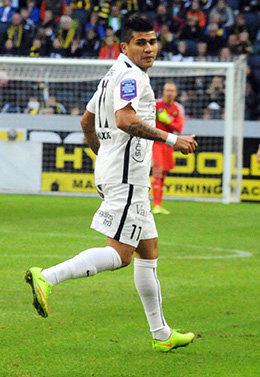
- Paulinho playing for BK Häcken in 2015

Personal information
- Full name: Paulo José de Oliveira
- Date of birth: 9 March 1986 (age 40)
- Place of birth: São José dos Campos, Brazil
- Height: 1.73 m (5 ft 8 in)
- Position: Forward

Team information
- Current team: São José

Youth career
- Palmeiras

Senior career*
Years	Team	Apps	(Gls)
2005–2006	São José		
2006	União Barbarense		
2007	Democrata		
2007–2010	BK Häcken	87	(37)
2011–2012	Örebro	19	(4)
2012	São José	4	(0)
2013–2014	Bragantino	6	(0)
2014	Paraná	10	(1)
2014	Al Dhafra	4	(0)
2015	XV de Piracicaba	15	(7)
2015–2019	BK Häcken	98	(60)
2020	Hapoel Be'er Sheva	0	(0)
2020–2021	Hammarby IF	27	(4)
2022–	São José	0	(0)
- * Club domestic league appearances and goals as of 8 January 2022

Paulo José de Oliveira (born 9 March 1986), commonly known as Paulinho Guerreiro or simply Paulinho, is a Brazilian professional footballer who plays as a forward for São José.

Having previously spent ten seasons at BK Häcken in the Swedish Allsvenskan, Paulinho is the club's all-time leading scorer with 113 goals in all competitions.

== Career ==
=== BK Häcken and Örebro SK ===
In the summer of 2007, Paulinho left his native Brazil and joined BK Häcken in Superettan, Sweden's second tier. In 2008, his second season with the club, BK Häcken got promoted to Allsvenskan. He played for the club for two more seasons in the first division, scoring 15 goals in 50 games, before leaving at the end of 2010.

In March 2011, Paulinho moved to Örebro SK in Allsvenskan, after failing to secure a contract elsewhere in Europe. He played 19 games for the club throughout the season, scoring four goals, but left for his native Brazil at the end of the year for personal reasons. His contract with Örebro SK was terminated in early 2012 by mutual consent.

=== Years in Brazil ===
Back in Brazil, Paulinho represented São José, Bragantino, Paraná and Piracicaba between 2012 and 2015. He also had a brief spell at Al Dhafra in the UAE Pro League.

=== Return to BK Häcken ===
On 15 April 2015, at age 29, Paulinho returned to BK Häcken in Allsvenskan. He immediately made an impact back at his former club, scoring 11 goals in 14 league games in the 2015 Allsvenskan.

In 2016, Paulinho was plagued by injuries, but scored nine goals in just 11 league games. He scored a penalty when BK Häcken won the 2015–16 Svenska Cupen on 5 May, the club's first ever domestic title, beating Malmö FF in the final after a 2–2 draw (5–6 on penalties).

In 2017, Paulinho scored nine goals in 25 games, as BK Häcken finished fourth in the Allsvenskan table. At the end of the season, on 21 December, he signed a new two-year contract with the club.

In 2018, Paulinho was the Allsvenskan top scorer, scoring 20 goals in 27 league games, as BK Häcken finished fifth in the table. At the end of the year, he was named the Most valuable player and Forward of the year in Allsvenskan.

In 2019, Paulinho scored 11 goals in 21 league games, as the club finished sixth in the Allsvenskan table. The club won the 2018–19 Svenska Cupen on 30 May, beating AFC Eskilstuna in the final after a 3–0 win. On 1 September, Paulinho became BK Häcken's all-time leading scorer with 113 goals in all competitions.

At the end of 2019, Paulinho left BK Häcken and signed a one-and-a-half-year contract with Hapoel Be'er Sheva in the Israeli Premier League.

=== Hammarby IF ===
On 24 January 2020, Paulinho returned to Sweden, after terminating his contract with Hapoel Be'er Sheva before making any appearances. He signed a two-year deal with Hammarby IF, sought out as a replacement for Nikola Đurđić. In a debut season plagued by injuries, Paulinho scored just three goals in 16 league games for his side, as Hammarby disappointedly finished in eight place in Allsvenskan. Paulinho scored in the first round of the 2020–21 UEFA Europa League against Puskás Akadémia (in a 3–0 win), before the club was eliminated from the tournament in the second round against Lech Poznań (in a 0–3 loss).

On 30 May 2021, Paulinho won the 2020–21 Svenska Cupen, the main domestic cup, with Hammarby through a 5–4 win on penalties (0–0 after full-time) against his former club BK Häcken in the final, where he scored his attempt. After recovering from an injury, Paulinho featured in the second leg as the club was knocked out in the play-off round of the 2021–22 UEFA Europa Conference League by Basel (4–4 on aggregate) after a penalty shoot-out, in which he missed his attempt. At the end of the year, it was announced that Paulinho would leave the club at the expiration of his contract.

=== Return to Brazil ===
On 7 January 2022, Paulinho returned to Brazil, signing with São José, making a third stint at his first professional club.

== Career statistics ==
As of 4 December 2021

Appearances and goals by club, season and competition
Club	Season	League			National Cup		Continental		Total	
Club	Season	Division	Apps	Goals	Apps	Goals	Apps	Goals	Apps	Goals
BK Häcken	2007	Superettan	17	13			4	1	21	14
BK Häcken	2008	Superettan	20	9			—		20	9
BK Häcken	2009	Allsvenskan	26	7	2	0	—		28	7
BK Häcken	2010	Allsvenskan	24	8			—		24	8
BK Häcken	Total		87	37	2	0	4	1	91	38
Örebro	2011	Allsvenskan	19	4	4	1	2	0	25	5
São José	2012	Paulista Série A2	4	0			—		4	0
Bragantino	2013	Série B	6	0			—		6	0
Al Dhafra	2014–15	Arabian Gulf League	4	0			—		4	0
XV de Piracicaba	2015	Paulista Série A1	15	7			—		15	7
BK Häcken	2015	Allsvenskan	14	11			—		14	11
BK Häcken	2016	Allsvenskan	11	9	6	7	2	0	19	16
BK Häcken	2017	Allsvenskan	25	9	3	1	—		28	10
BK Häcken	2018	Allsvenskan	27	20	4	2	4	1	36	26
BK Häcken	2019	Allsvenskan	21	11	7	5	2	0	30	16
BK Häcken	Total		98	60	20	15	8	1	127	77
Hammarby IF	2020	Allsvenskan	16	3	5	0	2	1	23	4
Hammarby IF	2021	Allsvenskan	10	1	1	0	1	0	12	1
Hammarby IF	Total		27	4	6	0	3	1	36	5
Career total			260	112	32	16	17	3	309	131

== Honours ==
BK Häcken

- Svenska Cupen: 2015–16, 2018–19

Hammarby IF

- Svenska Cupen: 2020–21

Individual

- Svenska Cupen Top goalscorer: 2015–16
- Allsvenskan Top goalscorer: 2018
- Allsvenskan Most Valuable Player: 2018
- Allsvenskan Forward of the Year: 2018
