= Adnan Kojic =

Swedish footballer

Personal information
- Date of birth: 28 October 1995 (age 31)
- Place of birth: Sweden
- Height: 1.85 m (6 ft 1 in)
- Position: Defender

Youth career
- Hageby IF
- IFK Norrköping

Senior career*
Years	Team	Apps	(Gls)
2013–2015	IFK Norrköping	0	(0)
2014	→ IF Sylvia (loan)	11	(0)
2016–2017	Halmstads BK	40	(0)
2018–2020	AFC Eskilstuna	82	(2)
2021	Varbergs BoIS	2	(0)
2022	IF Sylvia	10	(2)
2022	Kalmar FF	0	(0)
- * Club domestic league appearances and goals as of 23 July 2023

Adnan Kojic (born 28 October 1995) is a Swedish football defender. currently playing for IK Sleipner in Sweden.

He previously played for Kalmar FF, but was released after half a year without playing any matches.

In August 2023 he signed a contract with IK Sleipner.
