= Ferid Ali =

Swedish footballer

Personal information
- Full name: Ferid Ali
- Date of birth: 7 April 1992 (age 34)
- Place of birth: Sweden
- Height: 1.82 m (6 ft 0 in)
- Position: Midfielder

Youth career
- Vasalund

Senior career*
Years	Team	Apps	(Gls)
2010–2015	Vasalund	118	(32)
2016–2020	AFC Eskilstuna	100	(9)
- * Club domestic league appearances and goals as of 12:38, 14 November 2021 (UTC)

Ferid Ali (born 7 April 1992) is a Swedish footballer.

== Personal life ==
Born in Sweden, Ali is of Ethiopian descent.
