= Gustav Jarl =

Swedish footballer

Personal information
- Full name: Gustav Jarl
- Date of birth: 28 May 1995 (age 31)
- Place of birth: Sweden
- Height: 1.78 m (5 ft 10 in)
- Positions: Right back; left back

Youth career
- –2013: Höganäs BK

Senior career*
| Years | Team | Apps | (Gls) |
| 2013–2015 | Helsingborgs IF | 5 | (0) |
| 2014 | → Assyriska FF (loan) | 9 | (0) |
| 2015 | → AFC United (loan) | 13 | (0) |
| 2016 | Assyriska FF | 22 | (0) |
| 2017–2020 | AFC Eskilstuna | 38 | (2) |

International career
| 2010–2012 | Sweden U17 | 14 | (1) |
| 2012–2014 | Sweden U19 | 8 | (0) |
- * Club domestic league appearances and goals as of 12:18, 14 November 2021 (UTC)

Gustav Jarl (born 28 May 1995) is a Swedish footballer who plays as a defender.
