= 2019 Division 1 (Swedish football) =

Division 1
- Season: 2019
- Champions: Akropolis IF (Norra); Ljungskile SK (Södra)
- Promoted: Akropolis IF; Ljungskile SK; Umeå FC
- Relegated: Åtvidabergs FF; Bodens BK; Kristianstad FC; Rynninge IK; IK Oddevold; BK Forward
- Top goalscorer: Ekin Bulut (26 goals, Norra); Aniekpeno Udo; Jesper Westermark (18 goals each, Södra)
- Highest attendance: 5,022; Gefle IF 0–1 Sandvikens IF (15 June 2019)

The 2019 Division 1, part of the 2019 Swedish football season is the 14th season of Sweden's third-tier football league in its current format. The 2019 fixtures were released in December 2018. The season started on 6 April 2019 and ended on 2 November 2019.

== Teams ==
32 teams contest the league divided into two divisions, Norra and Södra. 22 returning from the 2018 season, three relegated from Superettan and seven promoted from Division 2. The champion of each division will qualify directly for promotion to Superettan, while the two runners-up compete in a play-off against the thirteenth and fourteenth teams from Superettan to decide who will play in the 2020 Superettan. The bottom three teams in each division will qualify directly for relegation to Division 2, while the two thirteenth-placed teams compete in a play-off with the top two runners-up from Division 2 to decide who will play in 2020 Division 1.

=== Stadia and locations ===
Locations of the 2019 Division 1 clubs
Red: Division 1 Norra; Green: Division 1 Södra

==== Norra ====
Team	Location	Stadium	Stadium capacity^{1}
Akropolis IF	Stockholm	Spånga IP	2,000
Bodens BK	Boden	Boden Arena	5,300
Carlstad United BK	Karlstad	Tingvalla IP	10,000
BK Forward	Örebro	Trängens IP	4,700
Gefle IF	Gävle	Gavlevallen	6,500
Karlslunds IF	Örebro	Karlslund Arena	2,000
Karlstad BK	Karlstad	Tingvalla IP	10,000
FC Linköping City	Linköping	Linköping Arena	8,300
Nyköpings BIS	Nyköping	Rosvalla IP	1,000
Rynninge IK	Örebro	Grenadjärvallen	1,500
Sandvikens IF	Sandviken	Jernvallen	7,000
Sollentuna FK	Sollentuna	Sollentunavallen	4,500
IF Sylvia	Norrköping	Östgötaporten	17,000
Team TG	Umeå	Umeå Energi Arena	10,000
Umeå FC	Umeå	Umeå Energi Arena	10,000
Vasalunds IF	Solna	Skytteholms IP	4,000

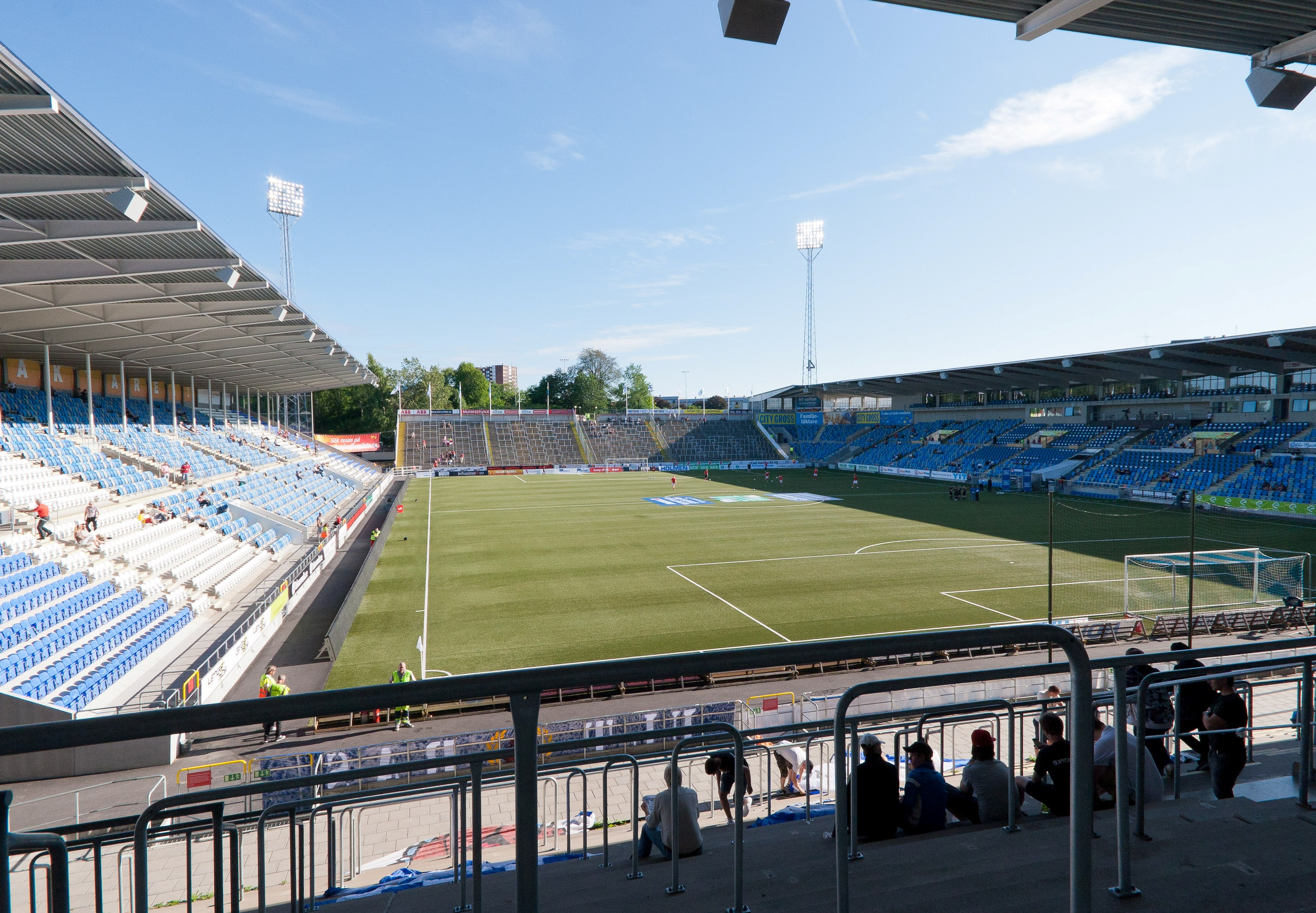
Östgötaporten in Norrköping.

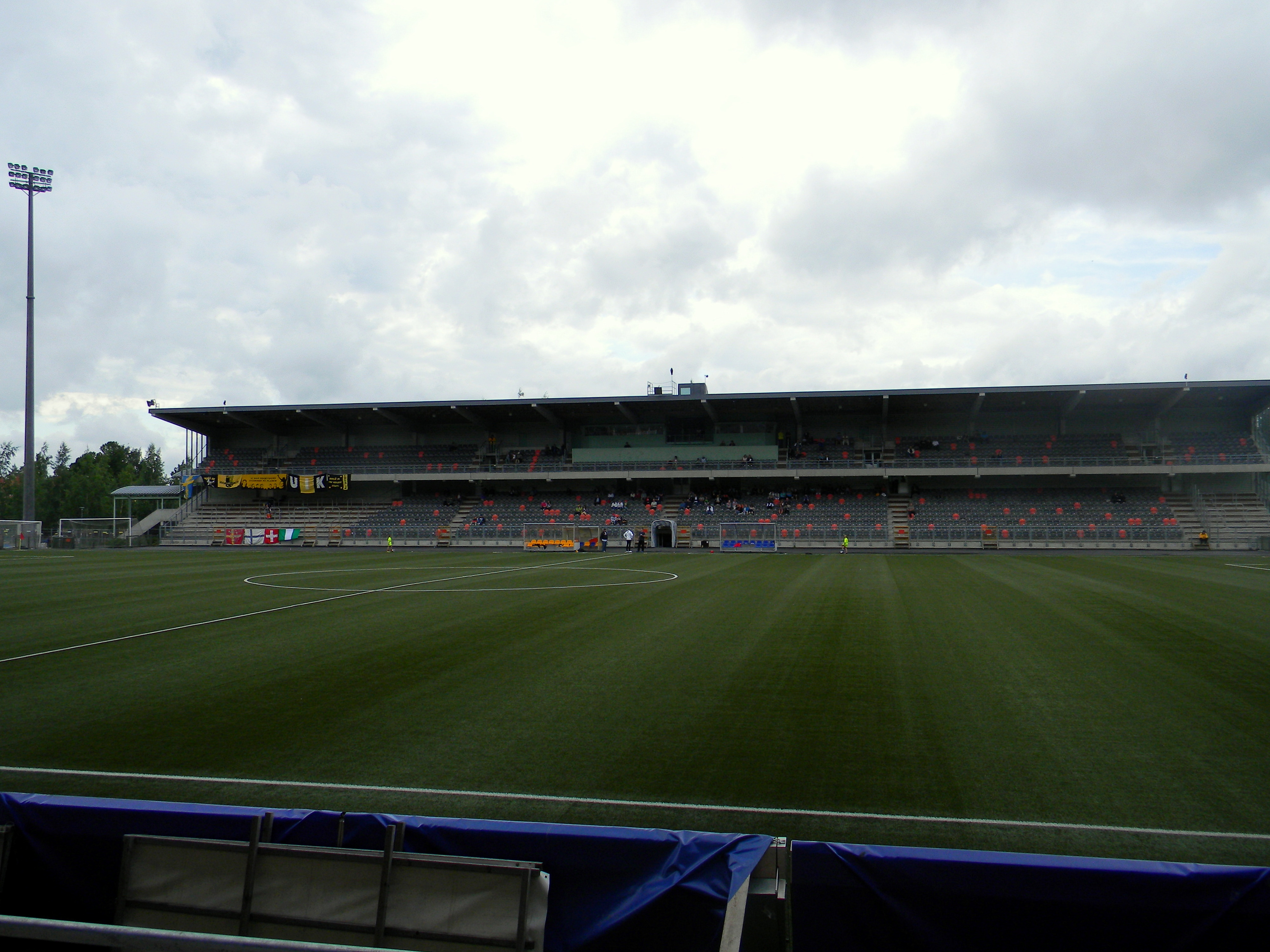
Umeå Energi Arena in Umeå.

==== Södra ====
Team	Location	Stadium	Stadium capacity^{1}
Assyriska IK	Jönköping	Rosenlunds IP	1,500
Eskilsminne IF	Helsingborg	Harlyckans IP	3,500
Kristianstad FC	Kristianstad	Kristianstad Fotbollsarena	3,000
Landskrona BoIS	Landskrona	Landskrona IP	10,500
Lindome GIF	Lindome	Lindevi IP	1,500
Ljungskile SK	Ljungskile	Skarsjövallen	8,000
Lunds BK	Lund	Klostergårdens IP	8,560
IK Oddevold	Uddevalla	Rimnersvallen	10,600
Oskarshamns AIK	Oskarshamn	Arena Oskarshamn	2,000
Skövde AIK	Skövde	Södermalms IP	4,500
Torns IF	Stångby	Tornvallen	1,500
FC Trollhättan	Trollhättan	Edsborgs IP	5,100
Tvååkers IF	Tvååker	Övrevi IP	1,000
Utsiktens BK	Gothenburg	Ruddalens IP	5,000
IFK Värnamo	Värnamo	Finnvedsvallen	5,000
Åtvidabergs FF	Åtvidaberg	Kopparvallen	8,000

- ^{1} Correct as of end of 2018 season

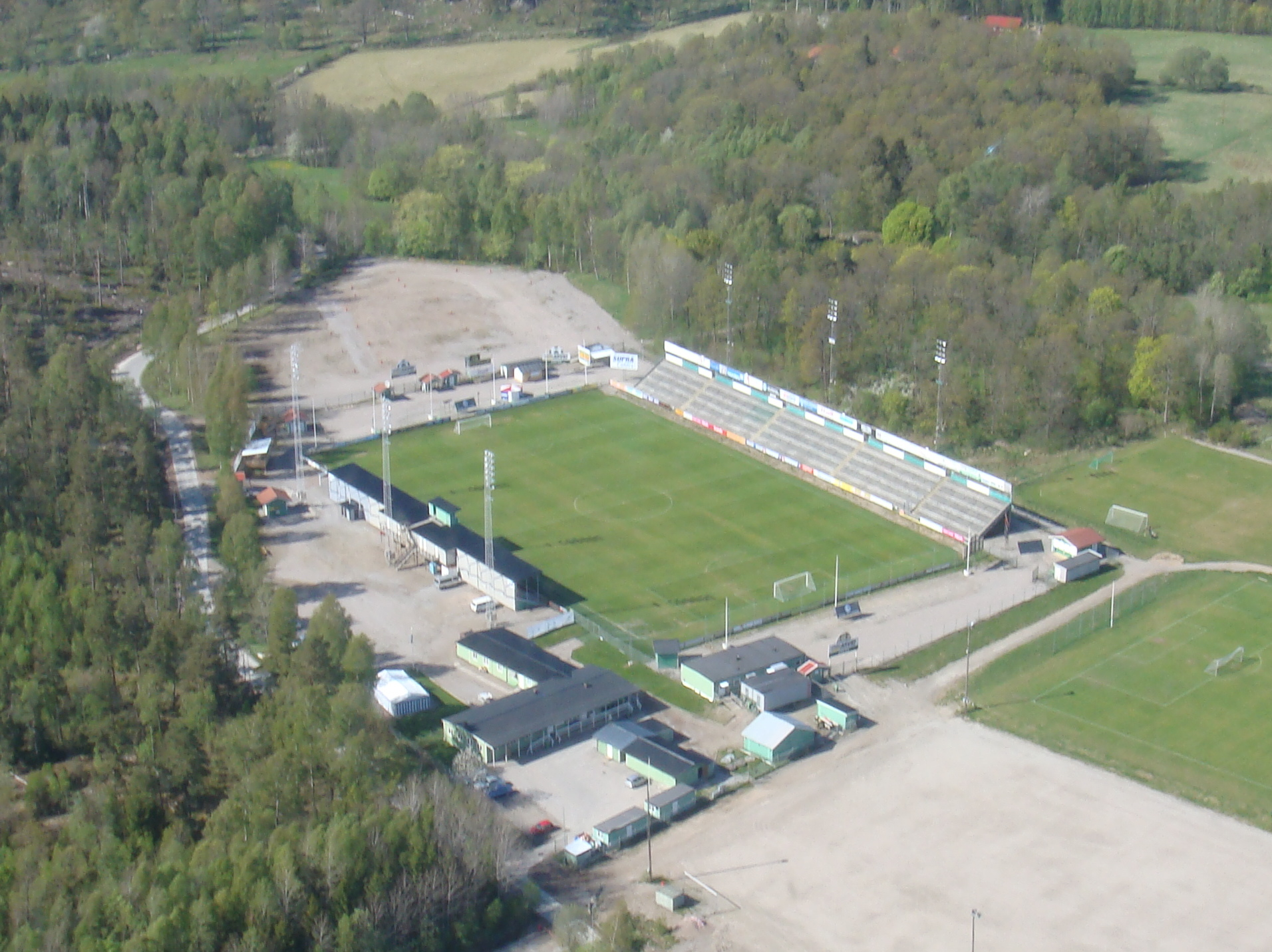
Skarsjövallen in Ljungskile.

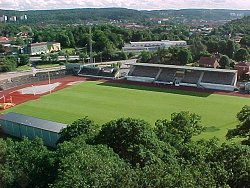
Rimnersvallen in Uddevalla.

== League tables ==
=== Norra ===
Pos	Team	Pld	W	D	L	GF	GA	GD	Pts	Promotion, qualification or relegation
1	Akropolis IF (C, P)	30	23	6	1	77	28	+49	75	Promotion to Superettan
2	Umeå FC (O, P)	30	17	5	8	52	35	+17	56	Qualification to Promotion playoffs
3	FC Linköping City	30	15	8	7	61	31	+30	53	
4	Carlstad United	30	15	8	7	56	43	+13	53	
5	Karlstad BK	30	15	6	9	53	35	+18	51	
6	Vasalunds IF	30	12	10	8	64	49	+15	46	
7	Sandvikens IF	30	12	7	11	52	47	+5	43	
8	Nyköpings BIS	30	10	8	12	45	54	−9	38	
9	IF Sylvia	30	11	5	14	48	65	−17	38	
10	Karlslunds IF	30	8	11	11	45	55	−10	35	
11	Gefle IF	30	10	4	16	33	48	−15	34	
12	Team TG	30	9	7	14	38	55	−17	34	
13	Sollentuna FK (O)	30	8	9	13	37	42	−5	33	Qualification to Relegation Playoffs
14	Bodens BK (R)	30	8	7	15	42	60	−18	31	Relegation to Division 2
15	Rynninge IK (R)	30	7	4	19	46	78	−32	25	Relegation to Division 2
16	BK Forward (R)	30	5	5	20	36	60	−24	20	Relegation to Division 2

Source: svenskfotboll.se (in Swedish)
Rules for classification: 1) Points; 2) Goal difference; 3) Number of goals scored; 4) Head-to-head points; 5) Head-to-head goal difference; 6) Head-to-head away goals scored
(C) Champions; (O) Play-off winners; (P) Promoted; (R) Relegated

=== Norra Results ===
Home \ Away	AIF	BBK	CU	BKF	GIF	KIF	KBK	FCLC	NBIS	RIK	SIF	SFK	IFS	TTG	UFC	VIF
Akropolis IF	—	8–0	2–2	2–1	3–0	4–3	2–0	0–0	2–0	2–0	1–3	1–1	4–1	4–0	2–1	3–1
Bodens BK	0–2	—	0–1	1–1	1–2	0–2	4–2	0–4	1–1	5–2	0–3	1–1	7–0	0–1	1–1	1–1
Carlstad United	0–3	3–1	—	2–0	2–1	1–2	2–2	0–0	2–1	3–3	2–1	3–1	3–2	1–1	2–1	4–3
BK Forward	0–3	1–3	2–2	—	4–2	2–0	2–3	0–0	2–4	3–2	0–1	1–3	2–3	2–0	1–2	1–2
Gefle IF	2–3	3–0	0–3	1–0	—	2–1	0–5	0–2	1–2	3–0	0–1	0–0	0–2	2–1	1–2	3–3
Karlslunds IF	1–1	2–5	1–4	1–1	1–1	—	2–1	0–0	0–0	4–0	0–0	2–1	3–1	1–1	2–1	3–4
Karlstad BK	1–2	0–1	1–2	3–1	1–2	1–1	—	4–1	2–1	3–2	2–0	0–1	1–0	3–0	1–0	2–2
FC Linköping City	2–3	4–0	1–0	4–1	3–0	6–1	0–1	—	3–0	2–0	1–3	4–0	3–2	3–0	0–0	2–2
Nyköpings BIS	1–1	2–0	2–1	1–3	2–1	4–1	0–4	2–2	—	3–1	3–3	0–0	3–0	1–1	2–1	2–3
Rynninge IK	2–3	1–2	2–1	2–1	0–1	1–1	2–1	1–2	6–4	—	4–3	1–3	1–1	2–1	1–2	2–7
Sandvikens IF	2–2	2–2	1–2	1–0	4–1	2–1	1–2	1–0	1–3	5–1	—	3–1	2–0	1–2	0–0	1–3
Sollentuna FK	0–2	2–3	1–3	1–1	0–1	1–2	0–0	1–3	1–1	0–1	3–1	—	6–0	1–2	3–2	1–0
IF Sylvia	1–3	4–2	2–2	4–2	1–0	1–0	0–2	2–1	3–0	3–3	4–1	1–1	—	3–1	1–3	1–2
Team TG	1–4	0–0	4–2	3–0	0–3	4–2	1–1	2–2	2–0	3–0	3–3	0–1	1–3	—	0–1	3–1
Umeå FC	1–3	2–0	1–0	2–1	1–0	3–3	1–2	5–3	3–0	3–1	3–1	2–1	1–1	3–0	—	2–1
Vasalunds IF	1–2	2–1	1–1	2–0	0–0	2–2	2–2	0–3	3–0	3–2	1–1	1–1	5–1	5–0	1–2	—

Source: Swedish Football Association (in Swedish)
Legend: Blue = home team win; Yellow = draw; Red = away team win.

=== Södra ===
Pos	Team	Pld	W	D	L	GF	GA	GD	Pts	Promotion, qualification or relegation
1	Ljungskile SK (C, P)	30	20	6	4	63	25	+38	66	Promotion to Superettan
2	Landskrona BoIS (Q)	30	16	10	4	47	19	+28	58	Qualification to Promotion playoffs
3	Utsiktens BK	30	14	9	7	49	36	+13	51	
4	Skövde AIK	30	14	7	9	44	33	+11	49	
5	FC Trollhättan	30	13	7	10	40	38	+2	46	
6	Tvååkers IF	30	11	11	8	41	37	+4	44	
7	IFK Värnamo	30	11	10	9	45	45	0	43	
8	Lunds BK	30	11	7	12	45	45	0	40	
9	Eskilsminne IF	30	10	7	13	39	41	−2	37	
10	Lindome GIF	30	10	7	13	33	36	−3	37	
11	Assyriska IK	30	10	7	13	33	41	−8	37	
12	Torns IF	30	9	9	12	35	41	−6	36	
13	Oskarshamns AIK (O)	30	8	9	13	44	56	−12	33	Qualification to Relegation Playoffs
14	Åtvidabergs FF (R)	30	8	7	15	35	51	−16	31	Relegation to Division 2
15	Kristianstad FC (R)	30	8	4	18	29	63	−34	28	Relegation to Division 2
16	IK Oddevold (R)	30	6	5	19	30	45	−15	23	Relegation to Division 2

Source: svenskfotboll.se (in Swedish)
Rules for classification: 1) Points; 2) Goal difference; 3) Number of goals scored; 4) Head-to-head points; 5) Head-to-head goal difference; 6) Head-to-head away goals scored
(C) Champions; (O) Play-off winners; (P) Promoted; (Q) Qualified for the phase indicated; (R) Relegated

=== Södra Results ===
Home \ Away	AIK	EIF	KFC	LBIS	LGIF	LSK	LBK	IKO	OAIK	SAIK	TIF	FCT	TVIF	UBK	IFKV	ÅFF
Assyriska IK	—	1–0	0–0	2–2	1–2	1–3	0–0	3–1	0–0	0–1	1–0	1–1	0–1	2–1	1–1	1–3
Eskilsminne IF	2–0	—	3–1	2–1	1–0	0–1	0–1	4–1	2–2	2–0	0–1	2–1	0–3	4–1	1–2	1–1
Kristianstad FC	2–1	1–3	—	0–6	1–0	2–3	0–2	1–0	1–2	0–1	0–2	0–2	1–1	2–1	3–2	1–2
Landskrona BoIS	0–2	2–0	0–1	—	2–0	1–1	2–0	1–0	1–1	0–0	3–0	1–0	0–0	1–0	4–0	1–0
Lindome GIF	1–2	0–0	5–1	0–0	—	2–0	1–3	0–4	0–0	1–0	3–0	0–0	1–3	3–0	5–1	1–3
Ljungskile SK	2–1	1–1	2–1	3–0	1–1	—	3–2	2–1	9–0	3–0	2–1	1–2	1–0	2–2	3–0	4–0
Lunds BK	3–0	3–0	3–1	0–2	1–1	1–2	—	0–2	3–1	2–1	2–2	1–1	0–1	2–1	0–2	0–2
IK Oddevold	0–1	4–1	2–3	0–1	0–1	0–1	0–3	—	3–3	1–2	0–0	0–2	1–2	1–1	3–1	3–1
Oskarshamns AIK	1–3	2–4	6–2	1–3	4–0	1–0	5–1	0–0	—	1–2	2–1	0–1	0–2	1–2	0–1	4–3
Skövde AIK	3–0	1–0	4–0	1–1	0–2	2–1	1–0	2–0	3–0	—	2–1	2–2	2–3	1–2	1–3	4–0
Torns IF	3–1	1–1	2–0	1–1	1–0	1–3	2–3	0–1	2–2	2–2	—	0–0	2–2	2–0	1–2	1–2
FC Trollhättan	2–4	3–2	1–1	0–1	2–0	0–2	2–2	4–1	0–2	2–1	1–2	—	1–0	0–1	3–0	2–1
Tvååkers IF	2–2	1–0	2–1	1–2	1–0	1–4	2–2	0–0	1–1	2–2	0–1	1–2	—	2–2	0–2	1–1
Utsiktens BK	2–1	2–0	0–0	1–1	3–0	0–0	3–2	1–0	4–2	0–0	4–1	2–0	3–2	—	1–1	3–0
IFK Värnamo	0–1	2–2	4–0	2–2	1–3	0–2	3–1	1–0	0–0	2–2	0–0	5–1	2–2	2–2	—	1–1
Åtvidabergs FF	2–0	1–1	1–2	0–5	0–0	1–1	2–2	3–1	2–0	0–1	1–2	0–2	1–2	1–2	0–2	—

Source: Swedish Football Association (in Swedish)
Legend: Blue = home team win; Yellow = draw; Red = away team win.

=== Playoffs ===
The 13th-placed teams of each division meets the best two runners-up from 2019 Division 2 in two-legged ties on a home-and-away basis with the team from Division 1 finishing at home.

6 November 2019
7:00 pm

Motala AIF	1–2	Sollentuna FK
Qasem 22'	Report	Pishdari 61'; Ramsell 74'

Motala Idrottspark, Motala
Attendance: 552
Referee: Enzo Vesprini
10 November 2019
4:00 pm

Sollentuna FK	2–0	Motala AIF
Pishdari 9'; Streete 36'	Report

Sollentunavallen, Sollentuna
Referee: Rambod Beigi

Sollentuna FK won 4–1 on aggregate.

6 November 2019
7:00 pm

IFK Berga	0–2	Oskarshamns AIK
	Report	Hellborg 12'; Niklasson 26'

Gasten IP, Kalmar
Attendance: 425
Referee: Fikret Buqa
10 November 2019
4:00 pm

Oskarshamns AIK	2–0	IFK Berga
Christensson 33'; Eliassi 60'	Report

Arena Oskarshamn, Oskarshamn
Attendance: 402
Referee: Andreas Johansson

Oskarshamns AIK won 4–0 on aggregate.

== Season statistics ==
=== Top scorers - Norra ===
As of 2 November 2019

Rank	Player	Club	Goals
1	(Sweden) Ekin Bulut	Vasalunds IF	26
2	(Sweden) Adhavan Rajamohan	Akropolis IF	19
2	(Sweden) Victor Söderström	Akropolis IF	19
4	(Sweden) Leo Englund	Sandvikens IF	17
5	(Sweden) Liridon Selmani	Karlstad BK	16
6	(Sweden) Victor Edvardsen	Karlstad BK	14
6	(Sweden) Timothy McNeil	Carlstad United	14
6	(Brazil) Michael	FC Linköping City	14
9	(Uganda) Alexis Bbakka	Carlstad United	13
10	(Nigeria) Isaac Boye	Umeå FC	12

=== Top scorers - Södra ===
As of 2 November 2019

Rank	Player	Club	Goals
1	(Nigeria) Aniekpeno Udo	Ljungskile SK	18
1	(Sweden) Jesper Westermark	Ljungskile SK	18
3	(Sweden) Amar Muhsin	Utsiktens BK	14
4	(Sweden) Albinot Rexhepi	FC Trollhättan	13
5	(Sweden) Christopher Christensson	Oskarshamns AIK	12
6	(Sweden) Teddy Bergqvist	Kristianstad FC	11
6	(Sweden) Emil Åberg	Eskilsminne IF	11
8	(Sweden) Alexander Johansson	Tvååkers IF	9
8	(Sweden) Linus Olsson	Landskrona BoIS	9
8	(Sweden) Jesper Rindmo	Lunds BK	9
