= 2020 Ettan =

15th season of Sweden's third-tier football league

Ettan
- Season: 2020
- Champions: Vasalunds IF (Norra); IFK Värnamo (Södra)
- Promoted: Vasalunds IF; IFK Värnamo; Landskrona BoIS
- Relegated: Karlslunds IF; Eskilsminne IF; Team TG; Motala AIF; FK Karlskrona; IFK Berga; Nyköpings BIS
- Top goalscorer: Ashley Coffey (27 goals, Norra); Simon Adjei (25 goals, Södra)
- Biggest home win: IFK Haninge 10–2 IFK Berga (14 November 2020)
- Biggest away win: FK Karlskrona 0–6 Linköping City (11 July 2020)
- Highest scoring: IFK Haninge 10–2 IFK Berga (14 November 2020)

The 2020 Ettan, part of the 2020 Swedish football season is the 15th season of Sweden's third-tier football league in its current format. The season started on 14 June 2020 and ended on 29 November 2020.

== Teams ==
32 teams contest the league divided into two divisions, Norra and Södra. 22 returning from the 2019 season, three relegated from Superettan and seven promoted from Division 2. The champion of each division will qualify directly for promotion to Superettan, while the two runners-up compete in a play-off against the thirteenth and fourteenth teams from Superettan to decide who will play in the 2021 Superettan. The bottom three teams in each division will qualify directly for relegation to Division 2, while the two thirteenth-placed teams play against each other while the top two runners-up from Division 2 play against each other to decide who will play in 2021 Ettan.

Norra

Team	Location	Stadium	Stadium capacity^{1}
Berga	Kalmar	Bergaviks IP	
Brommapojkarna	Vällingby	Grimsta IP	5,000
Frej	Täby kyrkby	Vikingavallen	2,650
Gefle IF	Gävle	Gavlevallen	6,500
IFK Haninge	Haninge	Torvalla IP	
Karlslunds IF	Örebro	Karlslund Arena	2,000
IF Karlstad	Karlstad	Tingvalla IP	10,000
Luleå	Luleå	Skogsvallen	2,500
Nyköpings BIS	Nyköping	Rosvalla IP	1,000
Sandvikens IF	Sandviken	Jernvallen	7,000
Sollentuna FK	Sollentuna	Sollentunavallen	4,500
Sylvia	Norrköping	Östgötaporten	17,000
Team TG	Umeå	Umeå Energi Arena	10,000
Täby	Täby	Tibblevallen	
Vasalunds IF	Solna	Skytteholms IP	4,000
Örebro Syrianska	Örebro	Örnsro IP	

Södra

Team	Location	Stadium	Stadium capacity^{1}
Assyriska IK	Jönköping	Rosenlunds IP	1,500
Eskilsminne	Helsingborg	Harlyckans IP	3,500
Karlskrona	Karlskrona	Västra Mark IP	4,000
Landskrona	Landskrona	Landskrona IP	10,500
Lindome	Lindome	Lindevi IP	1,500
Linköping City	Linköping	Linköping Arena	8,500
Lund	Lund	Klostergårdens IP	8,560
Motala	Motala	Motala Idrottspark	8,500
Oskarshamn	Oskarshamn	Arena Oskarshamn	2,000
Qviding	Gothenburg	Valhalla IP	4,000
Skövde	Skövde	Södermalms IP	4,500
Torn	Stångby	Tornvallen	1,500
Trollhättan	Trollhättan	Edsborgs IP	5,100
Tvååkers	Tvååker	Övrevi IP	1,000
Utsikten	Gothenburg	Ruddalens IP	5,000
Värnamo	Värnamo	Finnvedsvallen	5,000

== League tables ==
=== Norra ===
Pos	Team	Pld	W	D	L	GF	GA	GD	Pts	Promotion, qualification or relegation
1	Vasalunds IF (C, P)	30	22	3	5	88	38	+50	69	Promotion to Superettan
2	IF Brommapojkarna (Q)	30	18	8	4	63	23	+40	62	Qualification to Promotion playoffs
3	Sollentuna FK	30	18	6	6	63	43	+20	60	
4	IFK Haninge	30	18	5	7	77	47	+30	59	
5	IF Sylvia	30	17	8	5	59	42	+17	59	
6	Sandvikens IF	30	16	9	5	65	33	+32	57	
7	Gefle IF	30	13	10	7	57	43	+14	49	
8	IF Karlstad	30	10	7	13	53	53	0	37	
9	IK Frej	30	11	4	15	49	54	−5	37	
10	IFK Luleå	30	10	6	14	44	52	−8	36	
11	Täby FK	30	10	5	15	44	53	−9	35	
12	Örebro Syrianska	30	9	7	14	40	55	−15	34	
13	Karlslunds IF (R)	30	9	5	16	41	47	−6	32	Qualification to Relegation Playoffs
14	Team TG (R)	30	7	2	21	37	86	−49	23	Relegation to Division 2
15	IFK Berga (R)	30	4	3	23	32	83	−51	15	Relegation to Division 2
16	Nyköpings BIS (R)	30	2	4	24	32	92	−60	10	Relegation to Division 2

Source: svenskfotboll.se (in Swedish)
Rules for classification: 1) Points; 2) Goal difference; 3) Number of goals scored; 4) Head-to-head points; 5) Head-to-head goal difference; 6) Head-to-head away goals scored
(C) Champions; (P) Promoted; (Q) Qualified for the phase indicated; (R) Relegated

=== Södra ===
Pos	Team	Pld	W	D	L	GF	GA	GD	Pts	Promotion, qualification or relegation
1	IFK Värnamo (C, P)	30	20	3	7	60	26	+34	63	Promotion to Superettan
2	Landskrona BoIS (O, P)	30	17	8	5	54	30	+24	59	Qualification to Promotion playoffs
3	Utsiktens BK	30	14	11	5	59	36	+23	53	
4	Lindome GIF	30	14	6	10	50	35	+15	48	
5	Assyriska IK	30	14	4	12	52	45	+7	46	
6	Skövde AIK	30	13	4	13	61	54	+7	43	
7	FC Trollhättan	30	13	4	13	47	52	−5	43	
8	Torns IF	30	10	12	8	40	33	+7	42	
9	Linköping City	30	12	5	13	54	47	+7	41	
10	Oskarshamns AIK	30	11	7	12	50	56	−6	40	
11	Tvååkers IF	30	10	9	11	40	50	−10	39	
12	Qviding FIF	30	11	6	13	31	46	−15	39	
13	Lunds BK (O)	30	9	8	13	39	46	−7	35	Qualification to Relegation Playoffs
14	Eskilsminne IF (R)	30	9	8	13	42	55	−13	35	Relegation to Division 2
15	Motala AIF (R)	30	5	7	18	36	60	−24	22	Relegation to Division 2
16	FK Karlskrona (R)	30	4	6	20	36	80	−44	18	Relegation to Division 2

Source: svenskfotboll.se (in Swedish)
Rules for classification: 1) Points; 2) Goal difference; 3) Number of goals scored; 4) Head-to-head points; 5) Head-to-head goal difference; 6) Head-to-head away goals scored
(C) Champions; (O) Play-off winners; (P) Promoted; (R) Relegated

== Relegation play-offs ==
The 13th-placed teams of each division meet each other, and the best two runners-up from 2020 Division 2 meet each other, in two-legged ties on a home-and-away basis. The winners of each matchup qualify for the 2021 Division 1.

3 December 2020
7:00 pm

Västra Frölunda IF	2–0	Åtvidabergs FF
Furublad 36'; Zhubi 61' (pen.)	Report

Ruddalens IP, Gothenburg
Referee: Dino Demo
6 December 2020
2:00 pm

Åtvidabergs FF	3-0 (fft)	Västra Frölunda IF
Sandholm 18'; Bragg 53', 78'	Report	Acheampong 7'

Kopparvallen, Åtvidaberg
Referee: Fredrik Alknäs

Åtvidabergs won, 3-2, via forfeit.
Västra Frölunda IF player Anton Karl Delwér played in the second leg while suspended after his second yellow card of the season during the first leg. Västra Frölunda originally led the second leg, 3-1, and the aggregate, 3-3, via away goals rule (1-0), after both games. Result overturned after Delwér participated in the second leg in violation of rules.

3 December 2020
5:00 pm

Lunds BK	1–1	Karlslunds IF
Wernersson 63'	Report	Mansiamina 67'

Klostergårdens IP, Lund
Referee: Fikret Buqa
6 December 2020
2:00 pm

Karlslunds IF	0–2	Lunds BK
	Report	Stojanovic Fredin 11'; Båth Sågänger 75'

Karlslund Arena, Örebro
Referee: Adi Aganovic

Lunds BK won 3–1 on aggregate.

== Season statistics ==
=== Top scorers - Norra ===
As of 29 November 2020

Rank	Player	Club	Goals
1	(England) Ashley Coffey	IFK Haninge	27
2	(Guinea) Maï Traoré	Vasalunds IF	23
3	(Sweden) Ekin Bulut	Vasalunds IF	22
4	(Sweden) Isac Lidberg	Gefle IF	19
5	(Sweden) Marijan Cosic	IFK Haninge	18
6	(Sweden) Leo Englund	Sandvikens IF	17
7	(Sweden) Oskar Fallenius	IF Brommapojkarna	16
8	(Sweden) Jacob Hjelte	Gefle IF	14
8	(Sweden) Victor Kamf	Team TG	14

=== Top scorers - Södra ===
As of 28 November 2020

Rank	Player	Club	Goals
1	(Sweden) Simon Adjei	Assyriska IK	25
2	(Sweden) Emil Åberg	Eskilsminne IF	19
3	(Sweden) André Reinholdsson	Oskarshamns AIK	15
4	(Sierra Leone) Michael Kargbo	IFK Värnamo	14
5	(Sweden) Amar Muhsin	Skövde AIK	13
6	(Sweden) Viktor Granath	Skövde AIK	12
6	(Brazil) Paulo Marcelo Souza Alves	Utsiktens BK	12
6	(Sweden) Linus Olsson	Landskrona BoIS	12
6	(Sweden) Ajdin Zeljkovic	Lindome GIF	12
10	(Sweden) Robert Lipovac	Lindome GIF	11
