= List of Swedish football transfers summer 2021 =

This is a list of Swedish football transfers for the 2021 summer transfer window. Only transfers featuring Allsvenskan are listed.

== Allsvenskan ==
Note: Flags indicate national team as has been defined under FIFA eligibility rules. Players may hold more than one non-FIFA nationality.

=== AIK ===
In:

No.	Pos.	Nation	Player
15	GK	SWE	Kristoffer Nordfeldt (from (Turkey) Gençlerbirliği)
20	MF	IRL	Zack Elbouzedi (from (England) Lincoln City, previously on loan at (England) Bolton Wanderers)

Out:

No.	Pos.	Nation	Player
29	DF	SWE	Eric Kahl (to (Denmark) AGF)
—	FW	SWE	Paulos Abraham (to (Netherlands) Groningen, previously on loan)
—	DF	LBN	Felix Michel Melki (on loan to Eskilstuna, previously on loan at (Norway) Sarpsborg)

=== Degerfors IF ===
In:

No.	Pos.	Nation	Player
1	GK	ENG	Alfie Whiteman (on loan from (England) Tottenham Hotspur)
15	MF	SWE	Jakob Andersson (promoted from junior squad)
18	MF	SWE	Axel Lindahl (on loan from (Norway) Bodø/Glimt)
22	MF	SWE	Justin Salmon (from Västerås)
40	FW	SRB	Nikola Đurđić (from (China) Chengdu Rongcheng, previously on loan at (China) Zhejiang)

Out:

No.	Pos.	Nation	Player
1	GK	SWE	Ismael Diawara (to Malmö)
4	DF	SWE	Daniel Janevski (to (Norway) Mjøndalen)
26	GK	SWE	Hugo Claesson (on loan to Gute)

=== Djurgårdens IF ===
In:

No.	Pos.	Nation	Player

Out:

No.	Pos.	Nation	Player
8	MF	SWE	Elias Andersson (on loan to Mjällby)
16	DF	NOR	Aslak Fonn Witry (to (Netherlands) AZ)
18	DF	SWE	Isak Hien (on loan to Vasalund)
25	MF	SWE	Mattias Mitku (on loan to Haninge)
29	FW	JAM	Peter McGregor (on loan to Åtvidaberg)
31	DF	SWE	Axel Wallenborg (on loan to Haninge)
—	GK	NOR	Per Kristian Bråtveit (on loan to (France) Nîmes, previously on loan at (Netherlands) Groningen)

=== IF Elfsborg ===
In:

No.	Pos.	Nation	Player
2	DF	SWE	Gustaf Lagerbielke (from Västerås)
11	FW	ISL	Sveinn Aron Guðjohnsen (from (Italy) Spezia, previously on loan at (Denmark) OB)
33	GK	ISL	Hákon Rafn Valdimarsson (from (Iceland) Grótta)

Out:

No.	Pos.	Nation	Player
1	GK	NOR	Mathias Dyngeland (on loan to (Norway) Vålerenga)
2	DF	KEN	Joseph Okumu (to (Belgium) Gent)
16	MF	SWE	Robert Gojani (to (Denmark) Silkeborg)
30	GK	SWE	Simon Andersson (to Sollentuna)
—	FW	TUR	Deniz Hümmet (to (Turkey) Çaykur Rizespor, previously on loan at Örebro)

=== BK Häcken ===
In:

No.	Pos.	Nation	Player
15	MF	SWE	Samuel Gustafson (from (Italy) Cremonese)
32	MF	GHA	Nasiru Mohammed (free agent)
—	DF	NGA	Franklin Tebo Uchenna (on loan from (Nigeria) Nasarawa United)
—	DF	DEN	Kristoffer Lund (from (Denmark) Esbjerg)

Out:

No.	Pos.	Nation	Player
15	DF	SWE	Martin Olsson (to Malmö)
19	MF	SWE	Daleho Irandust (to (Netherlands) Groningen)
21		SWE	Rasmus Lindgren (retired)
24	MF	SWE	William Milovanovic (on loan to Norrby)
25	FW	SWE	Jack Lahne (loan return to (France) Amiens)
27	FW	SWE	Leonardo Farah Shahin (on loan to Eskilstuna)
28	MF	SWE	Samir Maarouf (on loan to Vasalund)
31	GK	SWE	Alexander Nadj (free agent)
—	DF	SWE	Aiham Ousou (to (Czech Republic) Slavia Prague, previously on loan at GAIS)

=== Halmstads BK ===
In:

No.	Pos.	Nation	Player

Out:

No.	Pos.	Nation	Player

=== Hammarby IF ===
In:

No.	Pos.	Nation	Player
7	FW	SVN	Aljoša Matko (from (Slovenia) Maribor)
27	DF	SWE	Josafat Mendes (from Hammarby TFF)
42	DF	DEN	Bjørn Paulsen (from (Germany) FC Ingolstadt 04)
43	MF	SWE	Jusef Erabi (from Hammarby TFF)
44	FW	SWE	Williot Swedberg (from Hammarby TFF)

Out:

No.	Pos.	Nation	Player
3	DF	SWE	Dennis Widgren (on loan to Sirius)
7	MF	SWE	Imad Khalili (retired)
19	MF	GHA	Abdul Halik Hudu (to (Denmark) Lyngby)
26	DF	SWE	Kalle Björklund (on loan to Västerås, previously on loan to Falkenberg)
31	MF	SWE	Aimar Sher (to (Italy) Spezia)
35	DF	SWE	Axel Sjöberg (on loan to Brage, previously on loan to Hammarby TFF)

=== IFK Göteborg ===
In:

No.	Pos.	Nation	Player
3	DF	BRA	Bernardo Vilar (from Värnamo)
13	MF	SWE	Gustav Svensson (from (China) Guangzhou City)
17	DF	SWE	Oscar Wendt (from (Germany) Borussia Mönchengladbach)
33	FW	SWE	Marcus Berg (from (Russia) Krasnodar)

Out:

No.	Pos.	Nation	Player
2	DF	SWE	Jesper Tolinsson (to (Belgium) Lommel)
3	MF	SWE	Pontus Wernbloom (retired)
6	DF	SWE	Rasmus Wikström (to (Denmark) Brøndby, previously on loan at Eskilstuna)
17	MF	SVK	Marek Hamšík (to (Turkey) Trabzonspor)
21	MF	SWE	Noah Alexandersson (on loan to (Norway) Moss)
27	DF	SWE	Yahya Kalley (to (Netherlands) Groningen)
28	MF	NGA	Alhassan Yusuf (to (Belgium) Antwerp)

=== Kalmar FF ===
In:

No.	Pos.	Nation	Player
—	FW	SSD	David Majak (on loan from (Kenya) Tusker)

Out:

No.	Pos.	Nation	Player
4	DF	KOS	Fidan Aliti (to (Switzerland) Zürich, previously on loan)
16	MF	SWE	Isak Magnusson (to Öster)
25	FW	SWE	Alex Mortensen (on loan to (Netherlands) Jong Groningen)
28	DF	SWE	Elias Olsson (on loan to (Netherlands) Jong Groningen)
—	FW	BRA	Maxwell (on loan to (Brazil) Guarani, previously on loan at (Brazil) Recife)
—	FW	SSD	David Majak (on loan to Luleå)

=== Malmö FF ===
In:

No.	Pos.	Nation	Player
4	DF	FIN	Niklas Moisander (from (Germany) Werder Bremen)
8	MF	PER	Sergio Peña (from (Netherlands) Emmen)
13	DF	SWE	Martin Olsson (from Häcken)
17	FW	GHA	Malik Abubakari (from (Portugal) Moreirense, previously on loan at (Portugal) Casa Pia)
21	MF	SWE	Peter Gwargis (from (England) Brighton & Hove Albion)
30	GK	SWE	Ismael Diawara (from Degerfor)

Out:

No.	Pos.	Nation	Player
8	MF	SWE	Pavle Vagić (to (Norway) Rosenborg)
25	MF	SWE	Aleksander Damnjanovic Nilsson (on loan to (Denmark) Jammerbugt)
26	MF	SWE	Mubaarak Muh (on loan to (Denmark) Jammerbugt)
28	MF	SWE	David Edvardsson (on loan to (Denmark) Jammerbugt)
30	GK	SWE	Marko Johansson (to (Germany) Hamburger SV)
33	MF	SWE	Amel Mujanić (on loan to Öster, previously on loan at (Denmark) Hobro)
39	FW	SWE	Amin Sarr (on loan to Mjällby)
40	DF	SWE	Hugo Andersson (on loan to Värnamo, previously on loan at (Denmark) Hobro)
—	DF	MLI	Ismaël Sidibé (on loan to (Denmark) Jammerbugt)

=== Mjällby AIF ===
In:

No.	Pos.	Nation	Player
6	MF	DEN	Magnus Wørts (from (Denmark) HB Køge)
11	FW	SWE	Amin Sarr (on loan from Malmö)
17	DF	ESP	Carlos Moros (from (Poland) ŁKS Łódź)
25	MF	SWE	Otto Rosengren (promoted from junior squad)
50	FW	LBR	Sam Johnson (free agent)
96	MF	SWE	Elias Andersson (on loan from Djurgården)

Out:

No.	Pos.	Nation	Player
3	DF	NED	Daan Klinkenberg (free agent)
6	DF	SWE	Eric Björkander (to (Turkey) Altay)
11	FW	SUI	Neftali Manzambi (loan return to (Spain) Sporting Gijón)

=== IFK Norrköping ===
In:

No.	Pos.	Nation	Player
3	DF	ISR	Yahav Gurfinkel (from (Israel) Maccabi Haifa, previously on loan at (Israel) Hapoel Haifa)
25	FW	SWE	Emanuel Chabo (promoted from junior squad)
31	DF	SWE	Edvin Tellgren (from Karlslund)

Out:

No.	Pos.	Nation	Player
8	MF	ISL	Ísak Bergmann Jóhannesson (to (Denmark) Copenhagen)
19	FW	SWE	Lucas Lima (on loan to Öster)
20	DF	HON	Kevin Álvarez (on loan to (Honduras) Real España)
22	MF	SWE	Manasse Kusu (on loan to Öster)
99	MF	MNE	Sead Hakšabanović (to (Russia) Rubin Kazan)

=== IK Sirius ===
In:

No.	Pos.	Nation	Player
16	FW	SWE	Herman Sjögrell (from Örgryte)
21	DF	SWE	Dennis Widgren (on loan from Hammarby)
23	MF	SWE	Moustafa Zeidan (from Jönköping)
29	FW	KOS	Edi Sylisufaj (on loan from Falkenberg)
30	GK	SWE	August Ahlin (from Gamla Upsala)

Out:

No.	Pos.	Nation	Player
1	GK	SWE	Lukas Jonsson (to (Denmark) Vendsyssel)
16	DF	SWE	Axel Björnström (to (Russia) Arsenal Tula)
19	FW	SWE	Ekin Bulut (on loan to Vasalund)
20	FW	SWE	Joakim Persson (on loan to Brage)
26	MF	ERI	Mohammed Saeid (to Trelleborg)
32	MF	SWE	Samuel Wikman (on loan to Gefle)

=== Varbergs BoIS ===
In:

No.	Pos.	Nation	Player
32	FW	NED	Des Kunst (from (Netherlands) Jong AZ)
95	DF	SWE	Adnan Kojic (free agent)

Out:

No.	Pos.	Nation	Player
1	GK	SWE	August Strömberg (to (Norway) Kongsvinger)
5	DF	SWE	Jakob Lindahl (to Västerås)
10	MF	SWE	Albin Mörfelt (to (Norway) Vålerenga)
14	DF	CIV	Adama Fofana (to (France) Dijon)
27	MF	SWE	Gustav Nordh (on loan to Gefle)

=== Örebro SK ===
In:

No.	Pos.	Nation	Player
4	DF	GHA	Nasiru Moro (from (Croatia) Gorica)
11	MF	SWE	Nahir Besara (from (United Arab Emirates) Hatta)
18	MF	IRQ	Jiloan Hamad (from (Croatia) Gorica)
20	MF	NGA	Richard Friday (on loan from (Latvia) Spartaks Jūrmala)
31	FW	BRA	Patrick Luan (on loan from (Switzerland) Sion, previously on loan at (Switzerland) Kriens)
—	MF	IRQ	Ahmed Yasin (from (Turkey) Denizlispor)

Out:

No.	Pos.	Nation	Player
7	FW	SWE	Erik Björndahl (on loan to Västerås)
11	MF	KOS	Alfred Ajdarević (free agent)
21	MF	SWE	Taha Ali (on loan to Västerås)
28	MF	USA	Romain Gall (loan return to Malmö)
37	FW	FIN	Rasmus Karjalainen (loan return to (Netherlands) Fortuna Sittard)
48	MF	SWE	Noel Milleskog (on loan to Karlslund)
99	FW	TUR	Deniz Hümmet (loan return to Elfsborg)

=== Östersunds FK ===
In:

No.	Pos.	Nation	Player

Out:

No.	Pos.	Nation	Player
24	DF	UGA	Ronald Mukiibi (free agent)

== See also ==
- 2021 Allsvenskan
