= Paulo Marcelo =

Brazilian footballer (born 1995)

Personal information
- Full name: Paulo Marcelo Souza Alves
- Date of birth: 20 July 1995 (age 31)
- Place of birth: Guaratinguetá, Brazil
- Height: 1.81 m (5 ft 11 in)
- Position: Forward

Youth career
- 2011–2014: São Paulo

Senior career*
Years	Team	Apps	(Gls)
2015–2017	São Bernardo	16	(3)
2016	→ Sampaio Corrêa (loan)	4	(0)
2017–2019	IFK Värnamo	37	(9)
2019–2020	GAIS	25	(3)
2020	→ Utsiktens (loan)	16	(12)
2021	Utsiktens	13	(11)
2022–2023	Amora	27	(12)
2023–2024	Utsiktens	11	(1)
2024	Atlético CP	15	(0)
- * Club domestic league appearances and goals as of 10 June 2024

Paulo Marcelo Souza Alves (born 20 July 1995) is a Brazilian professional footballer who plays as a forward.

== Career ==
On 10 August 2023, Paulo Marcelo returned to Superettan club Utsiktens.

On 3 January 2024, Paulo Marcelo returned to Portugal, signing for Liga 3 club Atlético CP.

== Career statistics ==
As of match played 24 November 2023

Appearances and goals by club, season and competition
Club	Season	League			State league		National cup		Other		Total	
Club	Season	Division	Apps	Goals	Apps	Goals	Apps	Goals	Apps	Goals	Apps	Goals
São Bernardo	2015	—	—		3 (Note: Appearances in Campeonato Paulista)	1	—		10 (Note: Appearances in Copa Paulista)	1	13	2
São Bernardo	2016	—	—		7	0	—		—		7	0
São Bernardo	2017	Série D	2	1	4	1	—		—		6	2
São Bernardo	Total		2	1	14	2	0	0	10	1	26	4
Sampaio Corrêa (loan)	2016	Série B	4	0	—		1	0	—		5	0
IFK Värnamo	2017	Superettan	11	2	—		1	2	—		12	4
IFK Värnamo	2018	Superettan	15	1	—		3	1	1 (Note: Appearance in Superettan relegation play-offs)	0	19	2
IFK Värnamo	2019	Ettan	11	6	—		4	2	—		15	8
IFK Värnamo	Total		37	9	—		8	5	1	0	46	14
GAIS	2019	Superettan	16	3	—		0	0	—		16	3
GAIS	2020	Superettan	9	0	—		2	0	—		11	0
GAIS	Total		25	3	—		2	0	—		27	3
Utsiktens(loan)	2020	Ettan	16	12	—		1	0	—		17	12
Utsiktens	2021	Ettan	13	11	—		0	0	—		13	11
Utsiktens	Total		29	23	—		1	0	—		30	23
Amora	2021–22	Liga 3	6	2	—		0	0	—		6	2
Amora	2022–23	Liga 3	21	10	—		1	0	—		22	10
Amora	Total		27	12	—		1	0	—		28	12
Utsiktens	2023	Superettan	11	1	—		1	1	1 (Note: Appearance in Allsvenskan play-off)	0	13	2
Atlético CP	2023–24	Liga 3	0	0	—		0	0	—		0	0
Career total			135	49	14	2	14	6	12	1	175	58
