= 2019 Superettan =

Superettan
- Season: 2019
- Champions: Mjällby AIF
- Promoted: Mjällby AIF; Varbergs BoIS
- Relegated: IK Frej; IF Brommapojkarna; Syrianska FC
- Top goalscorer: Erik Björndahl (20 goals)
- Biggest away win: Norrby IF 1–7 Jönköpings Södra IF (21 April 2019)
- Highest scoring: Norrby IF 1–7 Jönköpings Södra IF (21 April 2019); Norrby IF 4–4 Örgryte IS (3 November 2019)
- Longest winning run: 7 matches Varbergs BoIS; Mjällby AIF
- Longest unbeaten run: 12 matches Varbergs BoIS
- Longest winless run: 11 matches Östers IF; IK Frej
- Longest losing run: 5 matches GAIS
- Highest attendance: 9,903; Örgryte IS 1–0 GAIS (17 June 2019)
- Lowest attendance: 51; Dalkurd FF 3–2 Trelleborgs FF (29 September 2019)
- Average attendance: 1,632

The 2019 Superettan was part of the 2019 Swedish football season, and the 20th season of Superettan, Sweden's second-tier football division in its current format. A total of 16 teams contest the league.

== Teams ==
A total of 16 teams contest the league. The top two teams qualify directly for promotion to Allsvenskan, the third will enter a play-off for the chance of promotion. The two bottom teams are automatically relegated, while the 13th and 14th placed teams will compete in a play-off to determine whether they are relegated.

=== Stadia and locations ===
Locations of the 2019 Superettan teams

Team	Location	Stadium	Turf^{1}	Stadium capacity^{1}
Dalkurd FF	Gävle	Gavlevallen	Artificial	6,500
Degerfors IF	Degerfors	Stora Valla	Natural	12,500
GAIS	Gothenburg	Gamla Ullevi	Natural	18,416
Halmstads BK	Halmstad	Örjans Vall	Natural	10,873
IF Brommapojkarna	Stockholm	Grimsta IP	Artificial	8,000
IK Brage	Borlänge	Domnarvsvallen	Artificial	6,500
IK Frej	Täby kyrkby	Vikingavallen	Artificial	2,650
Jönköpings Södra IF	Jönköping	Stadsparksvallen	Natural	5,500
Mjällby AIF	Hällevik	Strandvallen	Natural	6,750
Norrby IF	Borås	Borås Arena	Artificial	17,800
Syrianska FC	Södertälje	Södertälje Fotbollsarena	Artificial	6,400
Trelleborgs FF	Trelleborg	Vångavallen	Natural	7,000
Varbergs BoIS	Varberg	Påskbergsvallen	Natural	4,500
Västerås SK	Västerås	Solid Park Arena	Artificial	7,000
Örgryte IS	Gothenburg	Gamla Ullevi	Natural	18,416
Östers IF	Växjö	Myresjöhus Arena	Natural	12,000

=== Personnel and sponsoring ===
This is the last season that all teams will be obligated to have the logo of the league sponsor Svenska Spel on their jersey, as Unibet will become the main league sponsor starting in 2020. Teams are also required to wear the Superettan logo on the right sleeve of their jerseys.

Note: Flags indicate national team as has been defined under FIFA eligibility rules. Players and Managers may hold more than one non-FIFA nationality.

Team	Head coach^{1}	Captain
Dalkurd FF	(Sweden) Paul Olausson	(Sweden) Peshraw Azizi
Degerfors IF	(Sweden) Stefan Jacobsson	(Sweden) Christoffer Wiktorsson
GAIS	(Sweden) Bosko Orović	(Sweden) Marcus Bergholtz
Halmstads BK	(Sweden) Magnus Haglund	(Sweden) Peter Larsson
IF Brommapojkarna	(Sweden) Roberth Björknesjö	(Sweden) Gustav Sandberg Magnusson
IK Brage	(Sweden) Klebér Saarenpää	(Sweden) Robbin Sellin
IK Frej	(Sweden) Lukasz Syberyjski	(Brazil) Pedro Ribeiro
Jönköpings Södra IF	(Sweden) Andreas Brännström	(Sweden) Tommy Thelin
Mjällby AIF	(Serbia) Miloš Milojević	(Sweden) David Löfquist
Norrby IF	(Lebanon) Mohammed Ali Khan	(Sweden) Marcus Översjö
Syrianska FC	(Sweden) Kuorosh Hatami	(Sweden) Sebastian Rajalakso
Trelleborgs FF	(Sweden) Peter Swärdh	(Sweden) Salif Camara Jönsson
Västerås SK	(Sweden) Thomas Gabrielsson	(Kosovo) Ilir Berisha
Varbergs BoIS	(Sweden) Joakim Persson	(United States) Matt Pyzdrowski
Örgryte IS	(Sweden) Thomas Askebrand	(Sweden) Daniel Paulson
Östers IF	(Sweden) Christian Järdler	(Sweden) Stefan Karlsson

== League table ==
Pos	Team	Pld	W	D	L	GF	GA	GD	Pts	Promotion, qualification or relegation
1	Mjällby AIF (C, P)	30	17	6	7	44	31	+13	57	Promotion to Allsvenskan
2	Varbergs BoIS (P)	30	15	10	5	49	27	+22	55	Promotion to Allsvenskan
3	IK Brage	30	16	6	8	54	33	+21	54	Qualification to promotion play-offs
4	Jönköpings Södra IF	30	15	7	8	52	31	+21	52	
5	Degerfors IF	30	15	6	9	46	34	+12	51	
6	Halmstads BK	30	14	4	12	45	34	+11	46	
7	Örgryte IS	30	12	10	8	43	37	+6	46	
8	Dalkurd FF	30	13	5	12	43	47	−4	44	
9	Norrby IF	30	11	9	10	43	43	0	42	
10	Västerås SK	30	8	10	12	41	40	+1	34	
11	Trelleborgs FF	30	7	11	12	34	47	−13	32	
12	GAIS	30	8	8	14	23	40	−17	32	
13	Östers IF (O)	30	6	11	13	32	43	−11	29	Qualification to relegation play-offs
14	IK Frej (R)	30	7	8	15	35	55	−20	29	Qualification to relegation play-offs
15	IF Brommapojkarna (R)	30	6	10	14	38	49	−11	28	Relegation to Ettan
16	Syrianska FC (R)	30	6	7	17	29	60	−31	25	Relegation to Ettan

Source: svenskfotboll.se (in Swedish)
Rules for classification: 1) Points; 2) Goal difference; 3) Number of goals scored; 4) Head-to-head points; 5) Head-to-head goal difference; 6) Head-to-head away goals scored
(C) Champions; (O) Play-off winners; (P) Promoted; (R) Relegated

=== Playoffs ===
The 13th-placed and 14th-placed teams of Superettan met the two runners-up from 2019 Division 1 (Norra and Södra) in two-legged ties on a home-and-away basis with the teams from Superettan finishing at home.

7 November 2019
7:00 pm

Landskrona BoIS	1–1	Östers IF
Olsson 9'	Report	Kapčević 13'

Landskrona IP, Landskrona
Attendance: 4,035
Referee: Johan Krantz
10 November 2019
1:00 pm

Östers IF	1–0	Landskrona BoIS
Keene 74'	Report

Myresjöhus Arena, Växjö
Attendance: 3,719
Referee: Adam Ladebäck

Östers IF won 2–1 on aggregate and qualified for the 2020 Superettan.

7 November 2019
7:00 pm

Umeå FC	1–1	IK Frej
Stigedahl 68'	Report	Hudu 90'

Umeå Energi Arena, Umeå
Attendance: 2,752
Referee: Per Melin
10 November 2019
1:00 pm

IK Frej	2–2	Umeå FC
Zeidan 24', 30'	Report	Boye 2', 13'

Vikingavallen, Täby kyrkby
Attendance: 1,428
Referee: Fredrik Klitte

3–3 on aggregate. Umeå FC won on away goals and qualified for the 2020 Superettan.

=== Positions by round ===
Team ╲ Round	1	2	3	4	5	6	7	8	9	10	11	12	13	14	15	16	17	18	19	20	21	22	23	24	25	26	27	28	29	30
Mjällby AIF	13	14	10	15	10	6	3	2	2	2	2	2	2	2	2	2	2	2	1	1	1	1	2	3	1	1	1	2	1	1
Varbergs BoIS	5	2	1	1	1	1	1	1	1	1	1	1	1	1	1	1	1	1	2	2	2	3	4	2	3	4	2	1	2	2
IK Brage	2	4	4	2	2	3	5	3	3	5	4	5	3	3	3	3	3	3	3	4	4	4	3	4	4	3	4	3	4	3
Jönköpings Södra IF	14	15	11	5	6	9	9	8	5	4	5	3	5	4	5	4	5	5	4	3	3	2	1	1	2	2	3	4	3	4
Degerfors IF	1	1	2	4	7	4	2	4	6	6	8	11	8	7	8	8	8	8	8	9	8	7	6	7	7	7	5	5	5	5
Halmstads BK	4	9	12	9	13	16	13	14	15	12	13	13	12	10	9	9	9	11	10	8	10	10	10	9	9	9	9	9	8	6
Örgryte IS	8	3	3	3	3	5	6	6	8	9	6	6	4	6	4	5	4	4	5	5	5	5	5	5	5	5	6	6	6	7
Dalkurd FF	11	13	15	11	15	11	14	15	11	8	9	7	7	8	7	6	6	7	7	7	7	6	7	6	6	6	7	7	7	8
Norrby IF	9	6	6	8	5	2	4	5	4	3	3	4	6	5	6	7	7	6	6	6	6	8	8	8	8	8	8	8	9	9
Västerås SK	3	5	7	6	4	8	7	9	9	11	12	9	10	9	10	10	11	10	9	10	9	9	11	10	10	10	12	10	10	10
Trelleborgs FF	6	12	14	14	9	10	11	11	10	10	7	10	11	12	13	12	10	9	11	11	11	11	9	11	11	11	10	11	11	11
GAIS	7	10	5	7	11	7	8	7	7	7	10	8	9	11	12	11	13	13	13	13	12	12	12	12	13	12	11	12	12	12
Östers IF	10	11	9	13	16	12	12	13	13	15	14	14	15	15	15	16	16	14	16	15	15	15	16	16	16	15	16	14	15	13
IK Frej	15	16	16	16	14	14	10	10	12	13	11	12	14	14	14	14	15	15	14	16	16	16	15	14	12	13	13	15	13	14
IF Brommapojkarna	12	7	8	12	8	13	15	12	14	16	16	16	16	16	16	15	14	16	15	14	14	14	14	13	14	14	15	13	14	15
Syrianska FC	16	8	13	10	12	15	16	16	16	14	15	15	13	13	11	13	12	12	12	12	13	13	13	15	15	16	14	16	16	16

Promotion to Allsvenskan
Promotion play-offs
Relegation play-offs
Relegation to Division 1

Source: everysport.com

== Season statistics ==
=== Top scorers ===
As of 3 November 2019

Rank	Player	Club	Goals
1	(Sweden) Erik Björndahl	Degerfors IF	20
2	(Sweden) Rasmus Wiedesheim-Paul	Halmstads BK	19
3	(Sweden) Edin Hamidovic	Jönköpings Södra IF	15
3	(Sweden) Christian Kouakou	IK Brage	15
3	(Sweden) Astrit Seljmani	Varbergs BoIS	15
6	(Sweden) Gustav Ludwigson	Örgryte IS	12
6	(Sweden) Anton Lundin	IK Brage	12
8	(Palestine) Ahmed Awad	Dalkurd FF	10
8	(The Gambia) Bubacarr Jobe	Mjällby AIF	10
8	(Northern Ireland) Daryl Smylie	Jönköpings Södra IF	10
