= Lindome GIF =

Swedish football club

- Full name: Lindome Gymnastik-och Idrottsförening
- Founded: 1928
- Ground: Lindevi IP; Lindome; Sweden
- Capacity: 1,500
- Chairman: Morris Björlin
- Head coach: Shako Barzingi
- Coach: Thomas Björk; Johan Nexborn; Tomas Rudevärn
- League: Division 1 Södra
- 2019: Division 1 Södra, 10th
- Website: http://www.lindomegif.se/
Home colours	Away colours

Lindome GIF is a Swedish football club located in Lindome in Mölndal Municipality, Västra Götaland County.

== Background ==
The club was formed on 31 January 1928 under the name Lindome IF through the merger of Lindome JUF, Anderstorps IF and Stationens IF. In 1960 the name was changed to Lindome GoIF (Lindome gymnastik och idrottsförening).

The original club members were farmers and youth members of the Jordbrukarungdomens Förbund (Farmers' Youth League) and the motive was simply that by engaging in sport, members could have fun together. Sports that the club engaged in included football but also table tennis, bandy, boxing, swimming and athletics.

Since their foundation Lindome GIF has participated mainly in the middle and lower divisions of the Swedish football league system. However, in 2007 the club won Division 2 Västra Götaland and were promoted to Division 1 Södra where they spent two seasons. The club currently plays in Division 2 Västra Götaland which is the fourth tier of Swedish football. They play their home matches at the Lindevi IP in Lindome.

Lindome GIF are affiliated to the Göteborgs Fotbollförbund.

== Season to season ==
Season	Level	Division	Section	Position	Movements
1998	Tier 5	Division 4	Göteborg B	8th	
1999	Tier 5	Division 4	Göteborg B	12th	Relegated
2000	Tier 6	Division 5	Göteborg B	2nd	Promoted
2001	Tier 5	Division 4	Göteborg B	9th	
2002	Tier 5	Division 4	Göteborg B	3rd	
2003	Tier 5	Division 4	Göteborg B	1st	Promoted
2004	Tier 4	Division 3	Mellersta Götaland	1st	Promoted
2005	Tier 3	Division 2	Mellersta Götaland	3rd	Promoted
2006*	Tier 3	Division 1	Södra	14th	Relegated
2007	Tier 4	Division 2	Västra Götaland	1st	Promoted
2008	Tier 3	Division 1	Södra	9th	
2009	Tier 3	Division 1	Södra	14th	Relegated
2010	Tier 4	Division 2	Södra Götaland	3rd	
2011	Tier 4	Division 2	Västra Götaland	4th	
2012	Tier 4	Division 2	Västra Götaland	3rd	
2013	Tier 4	Division 2	Västra Götaland	9th	
2014	Tier 4	Division 2	Västra Götaland	8th	
2015	Tier 4	Division 2	Västra Götaland	4th	
2016	Tier 4	Division 2	Västra Götaland	5th	
2017	Tier 4	Division 2	Västra Götaland	8th	
2018	Tier 4	Division 2	Västra Götaland	1st	Promoted
2019	Tier 3	Division 1	Södra	10th	
2020	Tier 3	Division 1	Södra	4th	

* League restructuring in 2006 resulted in a new division being created at Tier 3 and subsequent divisions dropping a level.

== Attendances ==
In recent seasons Lindome GIF have had the following average attendances:

Season	Average attendance	Division / Section	Level
2005	212	Div 2 Mellersta Götaland	Tier 3
2006	157	Div 1 Södra	Tier 3
2007	255	Div 2 Västra Götaland	Tier 4
2008	287	Div 1 Södra	Tier 3
2009	224	Div 1 Södra	Tier 3
2010	229	Div 2 Södra Götaland	Tier 4

* Attendances are provided in the Publikliga sections of the Svenska Fotbollförbundet website.
