= Mikael Steen =

Swedish footballer

Personal information
- Full name: Lars Mikael Sten
- Date of birth: 21 March 1971 (age 55)
- Position: Midfielder

Youth career
- Karlslunds IF HFK
- 1985–1988: Örebro SK

Senior career*
Years	Team	Apps	(Gls)
1988–2003	Örebro SK		
- * Club domestic league appearances and goals

Mikael Steen (born 21 March 1971) is a Swedish retired football midfielder.
