= 2019 The Dubai International Cup =

Friendly association football tournament played in the United Arab Emirates

Tournament details
- Host country: United Arab Emirates and United States
- Dates: January 21 – February 8
- Teams: 12 (from 3 confederations)
- Venues: 2 (in 2 host cities)

Final positions
- Champions: (Denmark) F.C. Copenhagen (1st title)

Tournament statistics
- Matches played: 10
- Goals scored: 31 (3.1 per match)

The 2019 The Dubai International Cup was the 4th edition of The Dubai International Cup, a friendly association football tournament played in the United Arab Emirates.

== Teams ==
Nation	Team	Location	Confederation	League
China	Shanghai SIPG	Shanghai	AFC	Chinese Super League
China	Henan Jianye	Zhengzhou	AFC	Chinese Super League
Uzbekistan	Pakhtakor Tashkent	Tashkent	AFC	Uzbekistan Super League
Uzbekistan	Lokomotiv Tashkent	Tashkent	AFC	Uzbekistan Super League
Kazakhstan	Astana	Astana	AFC	Kazakhstan Premier League
United States	New York City FC	New York City	CONCACAF	Major League Soccer
Belarus	Dynamo Brest	Brest	UEFA	Belarusian Premier League
Sweden	Örebro SK	Örebro	UEFA	Allsvenskan
Sweden	AIK Fotboll	Stockholm	UEFA	Allsvenskan
Denmark	F.C. Copenhagen	Copenhagen	UEFA	Danish Superliga
Denmark	Brøndby IF	Brøndby	UEFA	Danish Superliga
Denmark	FC Midtjylland	Herning	UEFA	Danish Superliga

== Group stage ==
Team	Pld	W	D	L	GF	GA	GD	Pts
(Denmark) F.C. Copenhagen	3	2	1	0	6	0	+6	7
(Denmark) Brøndby IF	2	2	0	0	6	1	+5	6
(Denmark) FC Midtjylland	2	2	0	0	6	3	+3	6
(Sweden) Örebro SK	2	0	2	0	2	2	0	2
(China) Shanghai SIPG	2	0	1	1	2	3	−1	1
(Uzbekistan) Pakhtakor Tashkent	2	0	1	1	2	3	−1	1
(Belarus) Dynamo Brest	1	0	1	0	1	1	0	1
(Sweden) AIK Fotboll	1	0	1	0	1	1	0	1
(United States) New York City	2	0	1	1	1	3	−2	1
(Uzbekistan) Lokomotiv Tashkent	1	0	0	1	1	5	−4	0
(Kazakhstan) Astana	2	0	0	2	2	8	−6	0

== Matches ==
January 21, 2019
16:00

Brøndby IF (Denmark)	5–1	(Uzbekistan) Lokomotiv Tashkent
Wilczek 39'; Erceg 52', 85'; Ibrogimov 53' (o.g.); Hedlund 82'	Report	Abdukhalikov 41'

Jebel Ali Centre of Excellence, Dubai
Referee: Yaquob Quasem

January 27, 2019
16:00

F.C. Copenhagen (Denmark)	4–0	(Kazakhstan) Astana
Falk 47'; N'Doye 55'; Sotiriou 77'; Daghim 84'	Report

Jebel Ali Centre of Excellence, Dubai

January 28, 2019
16:00

Brøndby IF (Denmark)	1–0	(Uzbekistan) Pakhtakor Tashkent
Uhre 64'	Report

Jebel Ali Centre of Excellence, Dubai

January 30, 2019
15:30

FC Midtjylland (Denmark)	4–2	(Kazakhstan) FC Astana
George 10'; Hassan 15'; Isaksen 66'; Onuachu 89'	Report	Tomasov 5', 7'

Jebel Ali Centre of Excellence, Dubai
Referee: Azeem Jalal

January 30, 2019
19:00

F.C. Copenhagen (Denmark)	0–0	(Sweden) Örebro SK
	Report

Jebel Ali Centre of Excellence, Dubai
Referee: Azeem Jalal

February 2, 2019
15:30

FC Midtjylland (Denmark)	2–2	(China) Shanghai SIPG
David 32', 43'	Report	Li Shenglong 20', 66'

Jebel Ali Centre of Excellence, Dubai
Referee: Azeem Jalal

February 3, 2019
15:00

New York City (United States)	0–2	(Denmark) F.C. Copenhagen
	Report	Skov 77', 79'

New York University Stadium, Abu Dhabi

February 4, 2019
17:00

Örebro SK (Sweden)	2–2	(Uzbekistan) Pakhtakor Tashkent
Boye 25'; Rogic 51'	Report	Komilov 36'; Masharipov 75'

Jebel Ali Centre of Excellence, Dubai

February 8, 2019
18:00

Shanghai SIPG (China)	1–1	(Belarus) Dynamo Brest
Oscar 78'	Report	Fameyeh 85'

Jebel Ali Centre of Excellence, Dubai
Referee: Azeem Jalal

February 9, 2019
17:00

New York City (United States)	1–1	(Sweden) AIK Fotboll
Mitriță 50'	Report	Sundgren 53' (pen.)

New York University Stadium, Abu Dhabi
