= Giles Stille =

English footballer and manager

Personal information
- Full name: Giles Kevin Stille
- Date of birth: 10 November 1958 (age 67)
- Place of birth: Westminster, England
- Height: 5 ft 9 in (1.75 m)
- Position: Midfielder

Team information
- Current team: Assyriska (manager)

Senior career*
Years	Team	Apps	(Gls)
197?–1979	Kingstonian		
1979–1984	Brighton & Hove Albion	27	(4)
1985–1987	Tegs		
1987	Sandåkerns		
1988	Umeå		
1989–1990	Forward		
1991–1992	Umeå		

Managerial career
- Tord
- 1998–1999: Jönköpings Södra
- Husqvarna
- 2007: Östers
- 2013: Linköping City
- 2014: Husqvarna
- 2015: Linköping City
- 2019: Zhejiang Yiteng
- 2021–: Assyriska IK
- * Club domestic league appearances and goals

Giles Kevin Stille (born 10 November 1958) is an English former professional footballer who played as a midfielder in the Football League for Brighton & Hove Albion. He went on to coach and manage in Sweden. He is the manager of Swedish Division 1 side Assyriska.

== Life and career ==
Stille was born in 1958 in Westminster. He attended Epsom College, a rugby-playing school, and took a degree in social history at Westfield College while playing football part-time for Kingstonian. He joined Brighton & Hove Albion in 1979, and turned professional after he graduated. He was never a first-team regular, and his career was blighted by a diagnosis of diabetes and a series of injuries including a chronic back problem. He remained with the club until 1984, contributing 4 goals from 29 appearances, and then returned to Kingstonian and worked as a mortgage broker. He played for Tegs SK in the Swedish lower divisions, and spent two English seasons with Crawley Town before returning to Sweden on a permanent basis to play and coach.

Under Stille's management, IK Tord won the 1995 Division 3 (fourth-tier) title, and he led Jönköpings Södra to two consecutive titles in 1998 and 1999. After three seasons with Husqvarna FF, he was appointed assistant manager of Superettan club Kalmar FF. The team won the 2003 Superettan title, and with it promotion to the Allsvenskan, and he stayed at the club for two seasons in the top flight. He returned to Husqvarna in 2006, and in January 2007, signed a three-year contract as manager of Superettan club Östers IF. Instead of challenging for the title as expected, Östers were heading for relegation when Stille was sacked in mid-September. Stille returned to Kalmar in 2009 and left in 2012. The club were looking for an assistant who was prepared to live in Kalmar; Stille's family were settled in Huskvarna.

After working in China, Stille returned to Sweden to take charge of Division 1 side Assyriska.
