= Laurie Bell (footballer) =

English footballer (born 1992)

Personal information
- Full name: Laurence Bell
- Date of birth: 1 September 1992 (age 34)
- Place of birth: Poynton, England
- Height: 1.88 m (6 ft 2 in)
- Position: Midfielder

Team information
- Current team: Forward Madison (U19 head coach)

Youth career
- 2000–2004: Stockport County
- 2004–2009: Manchester City
- 2009–2011: Rochdale

College career
Years	Team	Apps	(Gls)
2011–2014	Milwaukee Panthers	70	(26)

Senior career*
Years	Team	Apps	(Gls)
2014	Ventura County Fusion	10	(2)
2015	Tulsa Roughnecks	23	(1)
2016	Hyde United	14	(1)
2016	Karlslund	24	(11)
2016	Macclesfield Town	2	(0)
2016	→ Hyde United (loan)	10	(1)
2017–2018	Karlslund	52	(11)
2019	BK Forward	29	(7)
2020–2021	Örebro Syrianska	55	(10)
2022–2023	Caernarfon Town	29	(3)
2025	Forward Madison	0	(0)

Managerial career
- 2026–: Forward Madison (U19 head coach)
- * Club domestic league appearances and goals as of 0:53, 22 January 2026 (UTC)

Laurence "Laurie" Bell (born 1 September 1992) is an English football coach and former professional footballer who played as a defender and midfielder. Bell is the head coach for the U19 MLS Next club for Forward Madison.

== Playing career ==
=== Early career ===
Bell joined Stockport County's School of Excellence at the age of eight, before moving to Manchester City's academy four years later. However, City let him go at the age of 16. After which he spent two years on a youth team apprenticeship at Rochdale, where he was part of a Football League Youth Alliance-title winning squad. However the club released him in May 2011.

Bell played college soccer at the University of Wisconsin–Milwaukee between 2011 and 2014. In 2013, he captained the Milwaukee Panthers to their victory in the Horizon League conference and qualification to the 2013 NCAA Division I Men's Soccer Championship, scoring 13 goals along the way, and being named as the Horizon League's player of the year and an NCAA First-Team All-American. While at college, Bell also appeared for USL PDL club Ventura County Fusion in 2014.

Bell was invited to the MLS 2015 Combine, but, hampered by a recurrence of patellar tendinitis which he had suffered during his teenage years, went undrafted in the 2015 MLS SuperDraft.

=== Professional ===
Bell signed with United Soccer League club Tulsa Roughnecks in March 2015. After one season with the Roughnecks, and a spell with semi-professional side Hyde United in his native England, Bell joined Swedish second division club Karlslunds IF HFK on a one-year contract in April 2016. He was named Player of the Year at Karlsunds IF HFK, after recording 11 goals and 10 assists in 24 matches and firing Karlslunds to 5th position in Division 2 - the club's highest finish for 7 years.

In December 2016, The Guardian published a blog by Bell about the challenges of pursuing a relatively low paying football career. In January 2017 Bell joined English Conference side Macclesfield Town before being sent out on loan to Hyde United. In March 2017, Bell re-joined Swedish side Karlslunds IF HFK. In January 2019, Bell left Karlslunds to join fellow Division 1 side BK Forward. After a year with Forward, Bell joined newly promoted Division 1 side Örebro Syrianska on a one-year deal.

Bell was signed to a 25-day contract by Forward Madison of USL League One prior to their 2025 season. Bell made one appearance for Madison, starting and playing the full match in their 5–1 victory over Duluth FC in the first round of the 2025 U.S. Open Cup.

== Coaching career ==
At the beginning of 2026, Bell returned to Forward Madison, this time joining their MLS Next coaching staff as the head coach of their U19 team.
