= 2019 in Swedish football =

Football in Sweden
- Season: 2019

Men's football
- Allsvenskan: Djurgårdens IF
- Svenska Cupen: BK Häcken

The 2019 season was the 122nd season of competitive football in Sweden. The men's team attempted to qualify for UEFA Euro 2020, and the women's team participated in the 2019 FIFA Women's World Cup.

== Domestic results ==
=== Men's football ===
==== 2019 Allsvenskan ====
Pos	Team	Pld	W	D	L	GF	GA	GD	Pts	Qualification or relegation
1	Djurgårdens IF (C)	30	20	6	4	53	19	+34	66	Qualification for the Champions League first qualifying round
2	Malmö FF	30	19	8	3	56	16	+40	65	Qualification for the Europa League first qualifying round
3	Hammarby IF	30	20	5	5	75	38	+37	65	Qualification for the Europa League first qualifying round
4	AIK	30	19	5	6	47	24	+23	62	
5	IFK Norrköping	30	16	9	5	54	26	+28	57	
6	BK Häcken	30	14	7	9	44	29	+15	49	
7	IFK Göteborg	30	13	9	8	46	31	+15	48	Qualification for the Europa League second qualifying round (Note: IFK Göteborg qualified for the Europa League second qualifying round by winning the 2019–20 Svenska Cupen.)
8	IF Elfsborg	30	11	10	9	44	45	−1	43	
9	Örebro SK	30	9	6	15	40	56	−16	33	
10	Helsingborgs IF	30	8	6	16	29	49	−20	30	
11	IK Sirius	30	8	5	17	34	51	−17	29	
12	Östersunds FK	30	5	10	15	27	52	−25	25	
13	Falkenbergs FF	30	6	7	17	25	62	−37	25	
14	Kalmar FF (O)	30	4	11	15	22	47	−25	23	Qualification for the relegation play-offs
15	GIF Sundsvall (R)	30	4	8	18	31	50	−19	20	Relegation to the Superettan
16	AFC Eskilstuna (R)	30	4	8	18	23	55	−32	20	Relegation to the Superettan

Source: svenskfotboll.se (in Swedish)
Rules for classification: 1) Points; 2) Goal difference; 3) Goals scored; 4) Head-to-head points; 5) Head-to-head goal difference; 6) Head-to-head away goals scored; 7) Play-off
(Note: Play-off is only played if need to decide champion, teams for relegation or UEFA competition and will be played on a neutral ground).
(C) Champions; (O) Play-off winners; (R) Relegated

==== 2020 Allsvenskan play-offs ====
6 November 2019
19:00 (UTC+1)

IK Brage	0–2	Kalmar FF
	Report	Herrem 23'; Fröling 61'

Domnarvsvallen, Borlänge
Attendance: 3,554
Referee: Martin Strömbergsson
10 November 2019
14:45 (UTC+1)

Kalmar FF	2–2	IK Brage
Aliti 61'; Hallberg 86'	Report	Morsay 88'; Kouakou 90+2' (pen.)

Guldfågeln Arena, Kalmar
Attendance: 6,218
Referee: Mohammed Al-Hakim

Kalmar won 4–2 on aggregate.

==== 2019 Superettan ====
Pos	Team	Pld	W	D	L	GF	GA	GD	Pts	Promotion, qualification or relegation
1	Mjällby AIF (C, P)	30	17	6	7	44	31	+13	57	Promotion to Allsvenskan
2	Varbergs BoIS (P)	30	15	10	5	49	27	+22	55	Promotion to Allsvenskan
3	IK Brage	30	16	6	8	54	33	+21	54	Qualification to promotion play-offs
4	Jönköpings Södra IF	30	15	7	8	52	31	+21	52	
5	Degerfors IF	30	15	6	9	46	34	+12	51	
6	Halmstads BK	30	14	4	12	45	34	+11	46	
7	Örgryte IS	30	12	10	8	43	37	+6	46	
8	Dalkurd FF	30	13	5	12	43	47	−4	44	
9	Norrby IF	30	11	9	10	43	43	0	42	
10	Västerås SK	30	8	10	12	41	40	+1	34	
11	Trelleborgs FF	30	7	11	12	34	47	−13	32	
12	GAIS	30	8	8	14	23	40	−17	32	
13	Östers IF (O)	30	6	11	13	32	43	−11	29	Qualification to relegation play-offs
14	IK Frej (R)	30	7	8	15	35	55	−20	29	Qualification to relegation play-offs
15	IF Brommapojkarna (R)	30	6	10	14	38	49	−11	28	Relegation to Ettan
16	Syrianska FC (R)	30	6	7	17	29	60	−31	25	Relegation to Ettan

Source: svenskfotboll.se (in Swedish)
Rules for classification: 1) Points; 2) Goal difference; 3) Number of goals scored; 4) Head-to-head points; 5) Head-to-head goal difference; 6) Head-to-head away goals scored
(C) Champions; (O) Play-off winners; (P) Promoted; (R) Relegated

==== 2020 Superettan play-offs ====
7 November 2019
19:00 (UTC+1)

Landskrona BoIS	1–1	Östers IF
L. Olsson 9'	Report	Kapčević 13'

Landskrona IP, Landskrona
Attendance: 4,035
Referee: Johan Krantz
10 November 2019
13:00 (UTC+1)

Östers IF	1–0	Landskrona BoIS
Keene 74'	Report

Myresjöhus Arena, Växjö
Attendance: 3,719
Referee: Adam Ladebäck

Öster won 2–1 on aggregate.

7 November 2019
19:00 (UTC+1)

Umeå FC	1–1	IK Frej
Stigedahl 68'	Report	Hudu 90'

Umeå Energi Arena, Umeå
Attendance: 2,752
Referee: Per Melin
10 November 2019
13:00 (UTC+1)

IK Frej	2–2	Umeå FC
Zeidan 24', 30'	Report	Boye 2', 13'

Vikingavallen, Täby
Attendance: 1,428
Referee: Fredrik Klitte

3–3 on aggregate. Umeå won on away goals.

== National teams ==
=== Sweden men's national football team ===
==== UEFA Euro 2020 qualifying ====
===== Group F =====
Pos	Team	Pld	W	D	L	GF	GA	GD	Pts	Qualification
1	Spain	10	8	2	0	31	5	+26	26	Qualify for final tournament
2	Sweden	10	6	3	1	23	9	+14	21	Qualify for final tournament
3	Norway	10	4	5	1	19	11	+8	17	Advance to play-offs via Nations League
4	Romania	10	4	2	4	17	15	+2	14	Advance to play-offs via Nations League
5	Faroe Islands	10	1	0	9	4	30	−26	3 (Note: Tied on head-to-head points (3) and head-to-head goal difference (0). Head-to-head away goals: Faroe Islands 1, Malta 0.)	
6	Malta	10	1	0	9	3	27	−24	3	

Source: UEFA
Notes:

Win Draw Loss

23 March 2019 2020UEQ	Sweden	2–1	Romania	Solna, Sweden
18:00 (UTC+1)	Quaison 33'; Claesson 40'	Report (UEFA)	Keșerü 58'	Stadium: Friends Arena; Attendance: 30,115; Referee: Michael Oliver (England)

26 March 2019 2020UEQ	Norway	3–3	Sweden	Oslo, Norway
20:45 (UTC+2)	Johnsen 41'; King 59'; Kamara 90+7'	Report (UEFA)	Claesson 70'; Nordtveit 86' (o.g.); Quaison 90+1'	Stadium: Ullevaal Stadion; Attendance: 23,439; Referee: Gianluca Rocchi (Italy)

7 June 2019 2020UEQ	Sweden	3–0	Malta	Solna, Sweden
20:45 (UTC+2)	Quaison 2'; Claesson 50'; Isak 81'	Report (UEFA)		Stadium: Friends Arena; Attendance: 26,421; Referee: Rob Harvey (Republic of Ireland)

10 June 2019 2020UEQ	Spain	3–0	Sweden	Madrid, Spain
20:45 (UTC+02:00)	Ramos 64' (pen.); Morata 85' (pen.); Oyarzabal 87'	Report (UEFA)		Stadium: Santiago Bernabéu; Attendance: 72,205; Referee: William Collum (Scotland)

5 September 2019 2020UEQ	Faroe Islands	0–4	Sweden	Tórshavn, Faroe Islands
19:45 (UTC+1)		Report (UEFA)	Isak 12', 15'; Lindelöf 23'; Quaison 41'	Stadium: Tórsvøllur; Attendance: 3,108; Referee: Tiago Martins (Portugal)

8 September 2019 2020UEQ	Sweden	1–1	Norway	Solna, Sweden
20:45 (UTC+2)	Forsberg 60'	Report (UEFA)	Johansen 45'	Stadium: Friends Arena; Attendance: 38,872; Referee: Slavko Vinčić (Slovenia)

12 October 2019 2020UEQ	Malta	0–4	Sweden	Ta'Qali, Malta
20:45 (UTC+2)		Report (UEFA)	Danielson 11'; Larsson 58' (pen.), 71' (pen.); Agius 66' (o.g.)	Stadium: Ta' Qali Stadium; Attendance: 10,702; Referee: Sergey Ivanov (Russia)

15 October 2019 2020UEQ	Sweden	1–1	Spain	Solna, Sweden
20:45 (UTC+2)	Berg 50'	Report (UEFA)	Rodrigo 90+2'	Stadium: Friends Arena; Attendance: 49,712; Referee: Clément Turpin (France)

15 November 2019 2020UEQ	Romania	0–2	Sweden	Bucharest, Romania
21:45 (UTC+2)		Report (UEFA)	Berg 18'; Quaison 34'	Stadium: Arena Națională; Attendance: 49,678; Referee: Daniele Orsato (Italy)

18 November 2019 2020UEQ	Sweden	3–0	Faroe Islands	Solna, Sweden
20:45 (UTC+1)	Andersson 29'; Svanberg 72'; Guidetti 80'	Report (UEFA)		Stadium: Friends Arena; Attendance: 19,737; Referee: Matej Jug (Slovenia)

==== Friendlies ====
Win Draw Loss

8 January 2019	Sweden	0–1	Finland	Doha, Qatar
19:45 (UTC+3)		Report	Markkanen 22'	Stadium: Jassim bin Hamad Stadium; Attendance: 326; Referee: Abdulla Al-Marri (Qatar)

11 January 2019	Sweden	2–2	Iceland	Doha, Qatar
19:45 (UTC+3)	Gyökeres 47'; Thern 68'	Report	Karlsson 4'; Þorsteinsson 90+1'	Stadium: Khalifa International Stadium; Attendance: 187; Referee: Mohammed Al-Shummari (Qatar)

==== Total results summary ====
Overall								Home						Away					
Pld	W	D	L	GF	GA	GD	Pts	W	D	L	GF	GA	GD	W	D	L	GF	GA	GD
11	5	4	2	22	12	+10	19	2	3	1	9	6	+3	3	1	1	13	6	+7

Last updated: 16 November 2019.
Source: Svenskfotboll (in Swedish)

=== Sweden national under-21 football team ===
==== 2021 UEFA Euro Under-21 Championship qualification ====
===== Group 1 =====
Pos	Team	Pld	W	D	L	GF	GA	GD	Pts	Qualification
1	Italy	10	8	1	1	27	5	+22	25	Final tournament
2	Iceland	10	7	0	3	19	12	+7	21	Final tournament
3	Republic of Ireland	10	6	1	3	15	8	+7	19	
4	Sweden	10	6	0	4	31	12	+19	18	
5	Armenia	10	1	0	9	4	33	−29	3 (Note: Ranked on head-to-head goal difference: Armenia +1, Luxembourg −1.)	
6	Luxembourg	10	1	0	9	3	29	−26	3	

Source: UEFA
Rules for classification: Tiebreakers
Notes:

Win Draw Loss

10 September 2019	Sweden	1–3	Republic of Ireland	Kalmar, Sweden
18:30 (UTC+2)	Svanberg 19'	Report (UEFA)	Parrott 69', 90+2'; Masterson 87'	Stadium: Guldfågeln Arena; Attendance: 4,078; Referee: Rade Obrenović (Slovenia)

12 October 2019	Sweden	5–0	Iceland	Helsingborg, Sweden
15:45 (UTC+2)	Svanberg 22'; Gyökeres 38'; Leifsson 51' (o.g.); Kulusevski 60'; Erlingmark 75'	Report (UEFA)		Stadium: Olympia; Attendance: 1,832; Referee: Lawrence Visser (Belgium)

15 October 2019	Luxembourg	0–3	Sweden	Differdange, Luxembourg
19:00 (UTC+2)		Report (UEFA)	Kulusevski 22' (pen.); Larsson 32', 42'	Stadium: Stade Municipal de la Ville de Differdange; Attendance: 0 Referee: Gal Leibovitz (Israel)

19 November 2019	Republic of Ireland	4–1	Sweden	Dublin, Ireland
20:00 (UTC)	L. O'Connor 50'; Idah 63'; Parrott 73'; Elbouzedi 87'	Report (UEFA)	Gyökeres 18'	Stadium: Tallaght Stadium; Attendance: 2,760; Referee: Karim Abed (France)

==== Friendlies ====
Win Draw Loss

22 March 2019	Russia	2–0	Sweden	Marbella, Spain
17:00 (UTC+1)	Ignatyev 18'; Suleymanov	Report		Stadium: Marbella Football Center; Attendance: 137; Referee: Juan Gabriel Gallegos Jiménez (Spain)

25 March 2019	Scotland	1–2	Sweden	Marbella, Spain
12:30 (UTC+1)	Maguire 23'	Report	Hussein 8'; Mbunga-Kimpioka 38'	Stadium: Marbella Football Center; Attendance: 139; Referee: Juan Miguel Fort Mérida (Spain)

7 June 2019	Sweden	3–1	Norway	Helsingborg, Sweden
18:30 (UTC+2)	Risa 27' (o.g.); Mbunga-Kimpioka 59'; Gyökeres 83'	Report	Olden Larsen 36'	Stadium: Olympia; Attendance: 1,793; Referee: Helgi Mikael Jónasson (Iceland)

11 June 2019	Finland	2–3	Sweden	Lappeenranta, Finland
18:00 (UTC+3)	Ylätupa 9'; Valakari 85' (pen.)	Report	Beijmo 36'; Gyökeres 73'; Hansson 90+2' (pen.)	Stadium: Kimpisen urheilukeskus Attendance: 2,912; Referee: Roomer Tarajev (Estonia)

==== Total results summary ====
Overall								Home						Away					
Pld	W	D	L	GF	GA	GD	Pts	W	D	L	GF	GA	GD	W	D	L	GF	GA	GD
6	4	0	2	14	9	+5	12	2	0	1	9	4	+5	2	0	1	5	5	0

Last updated: 13 October 2019.
Source: Svenskfotboll (in Swedish)

=== Sweden men's national under-19 football team ===
==== 2020 UEFA European Under-19 Championship qualification ====
===== Group 9 =====
Pos	Team	Pld	W	D	L	GF	GA	GD	Pts	Qualification
1	Ukraine	3	2	1	0	7	2	+5	7	Elite round
2	Slovenia	3	1	2	0	10	3	+7	5	Elite round
3	Sweden (H)	3	1	1	1	7	4	+3	4	Elite round if best third-placed team
4	Estonia	3	0	0	3	0	15	−15	0	

First match(es) will be played: 13 November 2019. Source: UEFA
Rules for classification: Qualification tiebreakers
(H) Hosts

13 November 2019	Slovenia	2–2	Sweden	Gävle, Sweden
18:00 (UTC+1)	Simič 42'; Burin 54'	Report (UEFA)	Nygren 33'; Lahne 58'	Stadium: Gavlevallen; Attendance: 215; Referee: José Luis Munuera Montero (Spain)

16 November 2019	Sweden	4–0	Estonia	Sandviken, Sweden
13:00 (UTC+1)	Nygren 32', 67'; Suvinõmm 69' (o.g.); Hajal 71'	Report (UEFA)		Stadium: Jernvallen; Attendance: 311; Referee: Lawrence Visser (Belgium)

19 November 2019	Sweden	1–2	Ukraine	Gävle, Sweden
13:00 (UTC+1)	Lahne 52'	Report (UEFA)	Sikan 6', 43'	Stadium: Gavlevallen; Attendance: 552; Referee: José Luis Munuera Montero (Spain)

=== Sweden men's national under-17 football team ===
==== 2019 UEFA European Under-17 Championship qualification Elite Round ====
===== Group 8 =====
Pos	Team	Pld	W	D	L	GF	GA	GD	Pts	Qualification
1	France	3	3	0	0	6	0	+6	9	Final tournament
2	Sweden	3	1	1	1	2	3	−1	4	Final tournament
3	Serbia (H)	3	1	0	2	4	4	0	3	
4	Slovakia	3	0	1	2	1	6	−5	1	

Source: UEFA
Rules for classification: Qualification tiebreakers
(H) Hosts

Win Draw Loss

26 March 2019	Sweden	0–2	France	Stara Pazova, Serbia
12:00 (UTC+1)		Report (UEFA)	Traoré 4'; Agoumé 79' (pen.)	Stadium: Sportski centar FSS; Attendance: 100; Referee: Robert Hennessy (Republic of Ireland)

29 March 2019	Slovakia	0–0	Sweden	Stara Pazova, Serbia
12:00 (UTC+1)		Report (UEFA)		Stadium: Sportski centar FSS; Attendance: 100; Referee: Emmanouil Skoulas (Greece)

1 April 2019	Serbia	1–2	Sweden	Stara Pazova, Serbia
14:00 (UTC+2)	Kremenović 89'	Report (UEFA)	Prica 40' (pen.), 90+5'	Stadium: Sportski centar FSS; Attendance: 300; Referee: Emmanouil Skoulas (Greece)

==== 2019 UEFA European Under-17 Championship ====
===== Group B =====
Pos	Team	Pld	W	D	L	GF	GA	GD	Pts	Qualification
1	France	3	2	1	0	7	3	+4	7	Knockout stage
2	Netherlands	3	2	0	1	7	4	+3	6	Knockout stage
3	England	3	1	1	1	6	7	−1	4	
4	Sweden	3	0	0	3	3	9	−6	0	

Source: UEFA
Rules for classification: Group stage tiebreakers

Win Draw Loss

3 May 2019	Netherlands	2–0	Sweden	Waterford, Ireland
17:00 (UTC+1)	Brobbey 33'; Maatsen 34'	Report (UEFA)		Stadium: Waterford Regional Sports Centre; Attendance: 381; Referee: Krzysztof Jakubik (Poland)

6 May 2019	France	4–2	Sweden	Dublin, Ireland
17:00 (UTC+1)	Aouchiche 22', 39', 45'; Rutter 80'	Report (UEFA)	Elanga 17', 29'	Stadium: Tallaght Stadium; Attendance: 1,027; Referee: Donald Robertson (Scotland)

9 May 2019	Sweden	1–3	England	Dublin, Ireland
16:30 (UTC+)	Prica 28'	Report (UEFA)	Greenwood 15'; Jenks 76'; Gelhardt 82'	Stadium: Whitehall Stadium; Attendance: 522; Referee: Espen Eskås (Norway)

==== Four-nation tournament ====
Pos	Team	Pld	W	D	L	GF	GA	GD	Pts
1	Sweden	3	2	1	0	10	2	+8	7
2	Czech Republic	3	2	1	0	5	3	+2	7
3	Norway	3	1	0	2	2	4	−2	3
4	Romania	3	0	0	3	1	9	−8	0

Updated to match(es) played on 11 February 2019. Source: Svenskfotboll
Rules for classification: Tiebreakers

Win Draw Loss

7 February 2019	Romania	0–5	Sweden	La Manga, Spain
15:00 (UTC+1)		Report	Nilsson 26'; Peci 39'; Nanasi 59' (pen.), 77'; Uddenäs 66'	Stadium: La Manga Club Ground; Referee: Mohammad Usman Aslam (Norway)

9 February 2019	Norway	0–3	Sweden	La Manga, Spain
18:00 (UTC+1)		Report	Bergmark 17'; Eile 33'; Nanasi 83'	Stadium: La Manga Club Ground; Referee: Patrik Kmeč (Slovakia)

11 February 2019	Czech Republic	2–2	Sweden	La Manga, Spain
15:00 (UTC+1)	Sejk 40' (pen.); Svoboda 58'	Report	Bergmark 45'; Nanasi 53'	Stadium: La Manga Club Ground; Referee: Patrik Kmeč (Slovakia)

==== Total results summary ====
Overall								Home						Away					
Pld	W	D	L	GF	GA	GD	Pts	W	D	L	GF	GA	GD	W	D	L	GF	GA	GD
9	3	2	4	15	14	+1	11	0	0	2	1	5	−4	3	2	2	14	9	+5

Last updated: 9 June 2019.
Source: Svenskfotboll (in Swedish)

=== Sweden women's national football team ===
==== 2019 FIFA Women's World Cup ====
===== Group stage =====
Pos	Team	Pld	W	D	L	GF	GA	GD	Pts	Qualification
1	United States	3	3	0	0	18	0	+18	9	Advance to knockout stage
2	Sweden	3	2	0	1	7	3	+4	6	Advance to knockout stage
3	Chile	3	1	0	2	2	5	−3	3	
4	Thailand	3	0	0	3	1	20	−19	0	

Source: FIFA

Win Draw Loss

11 June 2019 Group F	Chile	0–2	Sweden	Rennes, France
18:00 (UTC+2)		Report (FIFA); Report	Asllani 83'; Janogy 90+4'	Stadium: Roazhon Park; Attendance: 15,875; Referee: Lucila Venegas (Mexico)

16 June 2019 Group F	Sweden	5–1	Thailand	Nice, France
15:00 (UTC+2)	Sembrant 6'; Asllani 19'; Rolfö 42'; Hurtig 81'; Rubensson 90+6' (pen.)	Report (FIFA); Report	Sungngoen 90+1'	Stadium: Allianz Riviera; Attendance: 9,354; Referee: Salima Mukansanga (Rwanda)

20 June 2019 Group F	Sweden	0–2	United States	Le Havre, France
21:00 (UTC+2)		Report (FIFA); Report	Horan 3'; Andersson 50' (o.g.)	Stadium: Stade Océane; Attendance: 22,418; Referee: Anastasia Pustovoitova (Russia)

===== Knock-out stage =====
24 June 2019 Round of 16	Sweden	1–0	Canada	Paris, France
21:00 (UTC+2)	Blackstenius 55'	Report (FIFA); Report		Stadium: Parc des Princes; Attendance: 38,078; Referee: Kate Jacewicz (Australia)

29 June 2019 Quarter-finals	Germany	1–2	Sweden	Rennes, France
18:00 (UTC+2)	Magull 16'	Report (FIFA); Report	Jakobsson 22'; Blackstenius 48'	Stadium: Roazhon Park; Attendance: 25,301; Referee: Stéphanie Frappart (France)

3 July 2019 Semi-finals	Netherlands	1–0 (a.e.t.)	Sweden	Lyon, France
21:00 (UTC+2)	Groenen 99'	Report (FIFA); Report		Stadium: Parc Olympique Lyonnais; Attendance: 48,452; Referee: Marie-Soleil Beaudoin (Canada)

6 July 2019 Third place play-off	England	1–2	Sweden	Nice, France
17:00 (UTC+2)	Kirby 31'	Report (FIFA); Report	Asllani 11'; Jakobsson 22'	Stadium: Allianz Riviera; Attendance: 20,316; Referee: Anastasia Pustovoitova (Russia)

==== UEFA Women's Euro 2021 qualifying ====
===== Group F =====
Pos	Team	Pld	W	D	L	GF	GA	GD	Pts	Qualification
1	Sweden	8	7	1	0	40	2	+38	22	Final tournament
2	Iceland	8	6	1	1	25	5	+20	19	Final tournament
3	Slovakia	8	3	1	4	7	19	−12	10	
4	Hungary	8	2	1	5	11	20	−9	7	
5	Latvia	8	0	0	8	2	39	−37	0	

Source: UEFA

Win Draw Loss

3 September 2019 2021UWEQ	Latvia	1–4	Sweden	Liepāja, Latvia
18:00 (UTC+3)	Ševcova 14'	Report (UEFA)	Sembrant 32'; Ilestedt 50'; Seger 59' (pen.); Asllani 68'	Stadium: Daugava Stadium; Attendance: 673; Referee: Abigail Marriott (England)

4 October 2019 2021UWEQ	Hungary	0–5	Sweden	Miskolc, Hungary
20:15 (UTC+2)		Report (UEFA)	Eriksson 13'; Janogy 46', 51'; Jakobsson 90+3'; Kullashi 90+5'	Stadium: Diósgyőri Stadion; Attendance: 1,428; Referee: Melis Özçiğdem (Turkey)

8 October 2019 2021UWEQ	Sweden	7–0	Slovakia	Gothenburg, Sweden
18:45 (UTC+2)	Asllani 26'; Hurtig 30'; Sembrant 34'; Björn 60'; Blackstenius 65', 68'; Rolfö 90'	Report (UEFA)		Stadium: Gamla Ullevi; Attendance: 9,748; Referee: Elvira Nurmustafina (Kazakhstan)

==== 2019 Algarve Cup ====
===== Group D =====
Pos	Team	Pld	W	D	L	GF	GA	GD	Pts
1	Sweden	2	1	0	1	5	3	+2	3
2	Portugal (H)	1	1	0	0	2	1	+1	3
3	Switzerland	1	0	0	1	1	4	−3	0

Updated to match(es) played on unknown. Source:
Rules for classification: Tiebreakers
(H) Hosts

27 February 2019 Group stage	Sweden	4–1	Switzerland	Faro, Portugal
16:45 (UTC+1)	Larsson 7', 40', 67'; Asllani 62'	Report	Crnogorčević 26'	Stadium: Estádio Algarve; Referee: Laura Fortunato (Argentina)

1 March 2019 Group stage	Portugal	2–1	Sweden	Albufeira, Portugal
16:45 (UTC+1)	Di. Silva 71'; Neto 90+3'	Report	Björn 68'	Stadium: Estádio Municipal de Albufeira; Referee: Maria-Belén Carvajal (Chile)

===== Third place play-off =====
6 March 2019 3rd place	Canada	0–0 (6–5 p)	Sweden	Faro, Portugal
17:00 (UTC+1)		Report		Stadium: Estádio Algarve; Referee: Anna-Marie Keighley (New Zealand)
	Penalties
	Schmidt (penalty scored); Sinclair (penalty missed); Rose (penalty scored); Lawrence (penalty scored); Beckie (penalty scored); Buchanan (penalty scored); Fleming (penalty scored)		(penalty scored) Anvegård; (penalty scored) Sembrant; (penalty scored) Björn; (penalty missed) Larsson; (penalty scored) Jakobsson; (penalty scored) Ericsson; (penalty missed) Glas

==== Friendlies ====
Win Draw Loss

22 January 2019	South Africa	0–0	Sweden	Cape Town, South Africa
18:00 (UTC+2)		Report		Stadium: Green Point Stadium; Attendance: 5,057; Referee: Letticia Viana (Swaziland)

6 April 2019	Sweden	1–2	Germany	Solna, Sweden
13:45 (UTC+2)	Seger 72' (pen.)	Report	Hendrich 51'; Dallmann 65'	Stadium: Friends Arena; Attendance: 25,882; Referee: Lina Lehtovaara (Finland)

9 April 2019	Austria	0–2	Sweden	Maria Enzersdorf, Austria
19:10 (UTC+2)		Report	Jakobsson 58'; Björn 87'	Stadium: BSFZ-Arena; Attendance: 2,150; Referee: Riem Hussein (Germany)

31 May 2019	Sweden	1–0	South Korea	Gothenburg, Sweden
18:45 (UTC+2)	Janogy 90+1'	Report		Stadium: Gamla Ullevi; Attendance: 6,854; Referee: Florence Guillemin (France)

7 November 2019	United States	3–2	Sweden	Columbus, OH, United States
19:30 (UTC-5)	Lloyd 6', 31'; Press 28'	Report	Anvegård 75', 79'	Stadium: Mapfre Stadium; Attendance: 20,903; Referee: Katja Koroleva (United States)

==== Total results summary ====
Overall								Home						Away					
Pld	W	D	L	GF	GA	GD	Pts	W	D	L	GF	GA	GD	W	D	L	GF	GA	GD
18	11	2	5	39	15	+24	35	5	0	2	19	6	+13	6	2	3	20	9	+11

Last updated: 10 November 2019.
Source: Svenskfotboll (in Swedish)
