= Nyköpings BIS =

Swedish football club

- Full name: Nyköpings Boll- och Idrottsällskap
- Nickname(s): Bissarna
- Founded: 1966; 59 years ago
- Ground: Rosvalla IP, Nyköping
- Capacity: 1,000
- Chairman: Ola Pettersson
- Manager: Brian Clarhaut
- League: Division 2
- 2022: Division 2 Södra Svealand, 4th of 14
- Website: www.bissarna.se
Home colours	Away colours

Nyköpings BIS is a Swedish football club located in Nyköping. The club started out as a merger in 1966 between Nyköpings SK and Nyköpings AIK. Since their foundation Nyköpings BIS has participated mainly in the middle divisions of the Swedish football league system in particular Divisions 2 and 3.

During the period 1971 until 1980 and again in 1984 Nyköpings BIS played in Division 2 which at that time was the second tier of Swedish football. The club currently plays in the third tier, Division 1. They play their home matches at the Rosvalla IP in Nyköping. Besides football Nyköpings BIS is also a track and field club.

The club is affiliated to the Södermanlands Fotbollförbund.

== Season to season ==
Season	Level	Division	Section	Position	Movements
1993	Tier 4	Division 3	Östra Svealand	6th	
1994	Tier 4	Division 3	Östra Svealand	1st	Promoted
1995	Tier 3	Division 2	Västra Svealand	9th	
1996	Tier 3	Division 2	Västra Svealand	10th	Relegation Playoffs
1997	Tier 3	Division 2	Västra Svealand	10th	Relegation Playoffs
1998	Tier 3	Division 2	Östra Götaland	11th	Relegated
1999	Tier 4	Division 3	Östra Svealand	2nd	
2000	Tier 4	Division 3	Östra Svealand	2nd	Promotion Playoffs – Promoted
2001	Tier 3	Division 2	Västra Svealand	12th	Relegated
2002	Tier 4	Division 3	Östra Svealand	5th	
2003	Tier 4	Division 3	Nordöstra Götaland	1st	Promoted
2004	Tier 3	Division 2	Östra Svealand	4th	
2005	Tier 3	Division 2	Östra Svealand	7th	
2006*	Tier 4	Division 2	Östra Svealand	8th	
2007	Tier 4	Division 2	Östra Svealand	4th	
2008	Tier 4	Division 2	Östra Götaland	6th	
2009	Tier 4	Division 2	Östra Svealand	9th	
2010	Tier 4	Division 2	Södra Svealand	3rd	
2011	Tier 4	Division 2	Södra Svealand	5th	
2012	Tier 4	Division 2	Södra Svealand	1st	Promoted
2013	Tier 3	Division 1	Norra	3rd	
2014	Tier 3	Division 1	Norra	7th	
2015	Tier 3	Division 1	Norra	6th	
2016	Tier 3	Division 1	Norra	7th	
2017	Tier 3	Division 1	Norra	4th	
2018	Tier 3	Division 1	Norra	10th	
2019	Tier 3	Division 1	Norra	8th	
2020	Tier 3	Division 1	Norra	16th	Relegated
2021	Tier 4	Division 2	Södra Svealand	3rd	
2022	Tier 4	Division 2	Södra Svealand	4th	
2023	Tier 4	Division 2	Södra Svealand	3rd	
2024	Tier 4	Division 2	Södra Svealand	4th	

* League restructuring in 2006 resulted in a new division being created at Tier 3 and subsequent divisions dropping a level.

== Current squad ==
As of 14 April 2025

Note: Flags indicate national team as defined under FIFA eligibility rules; some limited exceptions apply. Players may hold more than one non-FIFA nationality.

No.	Pos.	Nation	Player
1	GK	(Sweden) SWE	Elis Jäger
2	DF	(Sweden) SWE	Melker Lönn
4	DF	(Chile) CHI	Roman Tello
5	DF	(Sweden) SWE	Mohammed Wahap
6	MF	(Sweden) SWE	Robert Andbjer
7	MF	(Sweden) SWE	Naod Teklebrhan Ghebrekristos
8	MF	(Sweden) SWE	Rasmus Holmberg
9	FW	(Sweden) SWE	Albin Aljic
11	MF	(Sweden) SWE	Serder Hamo

No.	Pos.	Nation	Player
12	DF	(Sweden) SWE	Gustav Guimaraes Möller
13	DF	(Sweden) SWE	Pontus Nordenberg
14	FW	(Sweden) SWE	Elliot Nilsson
15	FW	(Sweden) SWE	Morris Blom
17	MF	(Sweden) SWE	Azali Amiri
21	MF	(Sweden) SWE	Markus Holm
22	MF	(Sweden) SWE	Hans Koffi Roux
26	MF	(Sweden) SWE	Sam Rosén
30	MF	(Sweden) SWE	Lukas Selander
