= Assyriska IK =

Swedish football club based in Jönköping

- Full name: Assyriska Turabdin IK
- Founded: 2009; 16 years ago
- Ground: Rosenlunds IP; Jönköping
- Chairman: Gabriel Remmo
- Manager: Giles Stille
- League: Division 1 Södra
- 2019: Division 1 Södra, 11th
| Home colours | Away colours |

Assyriska IK, also known as Assyriska Turabdin IK, is a Swedish football club based in Jönköping. The club was formed in 2009 by Assyrian immigrants from the Tur Abdin region in Turkey, and is currently playing in Division 1 Södra which is the third tier of Swedish football. They play their home matches at Rosenlunds IP in Jönköping. Assyriska IK are affiliated to the Smålands Fotbollförbund.

== See also ==
- List of Assyrian football teams in Sweden
