= Erik Björndahl =

Swedish footballer

Personal information
- Full name: Erik Peter Henrik Björndahl
- Date of birth: 13 July 1990 (age 36)
- Height: 1.89 m (6 ft 2 in)
- Position: Striker

Youth career
- BK Forward

Senior career*
Years	Team	Apps	(Gls)
2007–2017	BK Forward	137	(44)
2018–2019	Degerfors IF	55	(34)
2020–2023	Örebro SK	52	(7)
2021	→ Västerås SK (loan)	16	(10)
2023	IF Karlstad	22	(9)
- * Club domestic league appearances and goals as of 29 November 2023

Erik Björndahl (born 13 July 1990) is a Swedish footballer who plays as a striker. While at Degerfors IF, he was the 2019 Superettan top scorer.
