= IFK Berga =

Swedish football club

- Full name: Idrottsföreningen Kamraterna Berga
- Founded: 1933
- Ground: Bergaviks IP; Kalmar; Sweden
- Chairman: Michael Mårtensson
- Head coach: Mats Gunnarsson
- Coach: Lars Rudelius; Ola Håkansson; Lars Magnusson
- League: Division 1 Norra
- 2019: Division 2 Östra Götaland, 2nd (Promotion Playoffs)
Home colours	Away colours

IFK Berga is a Swedish football amateur club located in Kalmar.

== Background ==
Idrottsföreningen Kamraterna Berga are located in the district of Berga in Kalmar and were founded in 1933. The clubhouse is located next to the Bergaviks IP (sports ground). IFK Berga has over the years provided various sports activities, including football, table tennis and athletics. Bandy was played until the 1960s. Since 1994 the club has operated an active youth section with well-trained coaches and officials. The club now has about 500 active members, of whom over 400 are children/youngsters up to 16 years old.

Since their foundation IFK Berga has participated mainly in the middle and lower divisions of the Swedish football league system. The club currently plays in Division 2 Östra Götaland which is the fourth tier of Swedish football. They play their home matches at the Bergaviks IP in Kalmar.

IFK Berga are affiliated to Smålands Fotbollförbund.

== Recent history ==
In recent seasons IFK Berga have competed in the following divisions:

2011 – Division III, Sydöstra Götaland
2010 – Division IV, Småland Elit Östra
2009 – Division III, Sydöstra Götaland
2008 – Division IV, Småland Elit Östra
2007 – Division IV, Småland Östra Elit
2007 – Division IV, Småland Elit Södra
2006 – Division IV, Småland Södra Elit
2005 – Division IV, Småland Nordöstra
2004 – Division IV, Småland Sydöstra
2003 – Division IV, Småland Sydöstra
2002 – Division IV, Småland Sydöstra
2000 – Division IV, Småland Sydöstra
2000 – Division IV, Småland Sydöstra
1999 – Division IV, Småland Sydöstra

== Attendances ==
In recent seasons IFK Berga have had the following average attendances:

Season	Average attendance	Division / Section	Level
2008	Not available	Div 4 Småland Elit Östra	Tier 6
2009	123	Div 3 Sydöstra Götaland	Tier 5
2010	197	Div 4 Småland Elit Östra	Tier 6

* Attendances are provided in the Publikliga sections of the Svenska Fotbollförbundet website.
