= André Reinholdsson =

Swedish footballer (born 1996)

Personal information
- Full name: Tomas André Reinholdsson
- Date of birth: 25 April 1996 (age 30)
- Place of birth: Sweden
- Height: 1.86 m (6 ft 1 in)
- Position: Forward

Team information
- Current team: AFC Malmö
- Number: 21

Youth career
- Åhus Horna BK
- Nosaby IF
- Kristianstad
- Mjällby AIF

Senior career*
| Years | Team | Apps | (Gls) |
| 2013–2016 | Mjällby AIF | 6 | (0) |
| 2017–2018 | Ifö Bromölla IF | 43 | (41) |
| 2019–2020 | Trelleborgs FF | 9 | (0) |
| 2020 | → Oskarshamns AIK (loan) | 25 | (15) |
| 2021–2022 | IK Brage | 24 | (3) |
| 2022 | Norrby IF | 11 | (0) |
| 2023 | Eskilsminne IF | 26 | (6) |
| 2024– | AFC Malmö | 34 | (12) |
- * Club domestic league appearances and goals as of 16 November 2026

Tomas André Reinholdsson (born 25 April 1996) is a Swedish footballer who plays as a forward for Ettan Södra club AFC Malmö.
