= Abdul Halik Hudu =

Ghanaian professional football player

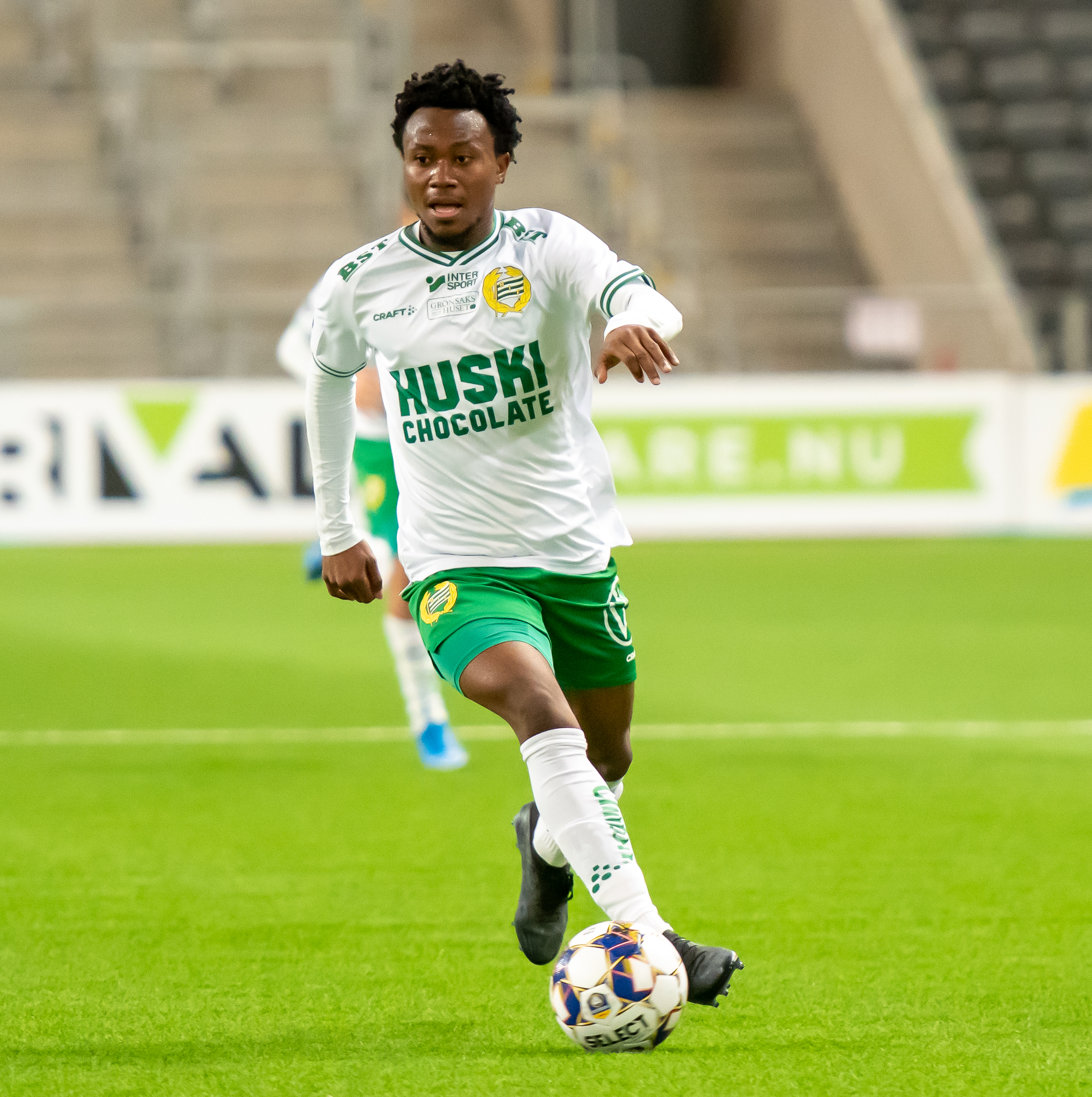
- Hudu with Hammarby IF in 2021.

Personal information
- Date of birth: 19 March 2000 (age 26)
- Place of birth: Accra, Ghana
- Height: 1.68 m (5 ft 6 in)
- Position: Midfielder

Youth career
- –2015: Accra Youth FC

Senior career*
Years	Team	Apps	(Gls)
2016–2018	Inter Allies	37	(2)
2018–2021	Hammarby	1	(0)
2019–2020	→ Frej (loan)	35	(3)
2020	→ GIF Sundsvall (loan)	21	(0)
2021–2022	Lyngby	4	(0)
2022–2023	AFC Eskilstuna	54	(1)
2024	GIF Sundsvall	29	(0)
2025	Al-Wehdat	4	(0)
2025–2026	Rajasthan United	0	(0)
2026	SC Delhi	13	(0)

International career^{‡}
2016	Ghana U17		
- * Club domestic league appearances and goals as of 10:22, 21 May 2026 (UTC) ‡ National team caps and goals as of 26 March 2018

Abdul Halik Hudu (born 19 March 2000), commonly known as Rooney, is a Ghanaian professional footballer who plays as a midfielder.

== Club career ==
=== Inter Allies ===
Halik Hudu started his professional football career with Inter Allies in the Ghana Premier League, getting promoted from their feeder club Accra Youth FC.

During his debut season in 2016, Halik Hudu played 19 games and soon established himself as a starter. At the end of the season, he was crowned "Most Promising Player of the Year" in the Ghanaian Premier League, and also got voted as the "Fans' Player of the Season" at Inter Allies.

In early 2017, Halik Hudu went on a two month-trial with Hammarby IF, appearing in friendlies for the Swedish club. He returned to Inter Allies before the start of the season in March, and went on to win the prize as "Man of the Match" in three league games throughout the year. In total, he made 37 competitive appearances for Inter Allies across two full seasons, scoring twice.

=== Hammarby IF ===
In early January 2018, Halik Hudu returned to Hammarby IF for a second trial. On 26 March, a week after his 18th birthday, Halik Hudu completed a permanent transfer to the Allsvenskan club and signed a three-and-a-half-year contract. On 23 August, Halik Hudu scored in his competitive debut for Hammarby, a 3–0 away win against Carlstad United in the Svenska Cupen.

In 2019, Halik Hudu went on a season-long loan to IK Frej in Superettan. He played 26 games and scored twice as the club was relegated from the Swedish second division.

On 28 July 2020, Halik Hudu was loaned out to GIF Sundsvall for the remainder of the season, and also signed a one-year extension of his contract with Hammarby.

On 30 May 2021, Halik Hudu won the 2020–21 Svenska Cupen, the main domestic cup, with Hammarby IF through a 5–4 win on penalties (0–0 after full-time) against BK Häcken in the final.

=== Lyngby ===
On 16 July 2021, Halik Hudu signed a two-year contract with Lyngby in the second-tier Danish 1st Division. He made his debut for the club on 30 July as a late substitute for Rasmus Thellufsen in a 2–1 away win over Jammerbugt.

=== AFC Eskilstuna ===
On 28 March 2022, Halik Hudu signed a two-year contract with AFC Eskilstuna in Sweden.

=== Return to GIF Sundsvall ===
On 14 December 2023, Halik Hudu signed with GIF Sundsvall for three seasons.

=== Al-Wehdat SC ===
In January 2025, Halik Hudu signed with Jordanian Pro League side Al-Wehdat SC.

== International career ==
Halik Hudu has been capped by the Ghana national under-17 team. He also captained his country in an 8–0 victory against Namibia in March 2016.

In 2018, Halik Hudu was called up to the Ghana national under-20 team ahead of an Africa Cup of Nations qualifier against Algeria on 11 May.

== Career statistics ==
As of 27 September 2021

Appearances and goals by club, season and competition
Club	Season	League			Cup		Europe		Other		Total	
Club	Season	Division	Apps	Goals	Apps	Goals	Apps	Goals	Apps	Goals	Apps	Goals
Inter Allies	2016	Ghanaian Premier League	15	1	0	0	—		—		15	1
Inter Allies	2017	Ghanaian Premier League	22	1	0	0	—		—		22	1
Inter Allies	Total		37	2	0	0	—		—		37	2
Hammarby	2018	Allsvenskan	0	0	1	0	—		—		1	0
Hammarby	2019	Allsvenskan	0	0	0	0	—		—		0	0
Hammarby	2020	Allsvenskan	0	0	0	0	—		—		0	0
Hammarby	2021	Allsvenskan	1	0	4	0	—		—		5	0
Hammarby	Total		1	0	5	0	—		—		6	0
Frej (loan)	2019	Superettan	26	2	3	0	—		2 (Note: Appearances in the Superettan relegation play-offs)	1	31	3
Frej (loan)	2020	Ettan Norra	9	1	0	0	—		—		9	1
Frej (loan)	Total		35	3	3	0	—		2	1	40	4
GIF Sundsvall (loan)	2020	Superettan	21	0	0	0	—		—		21	0
Lyngby	2021–22	1st Division	2	0	3	0	—		—		5	0
Career total			96	5	11	0	0	0	2	1	109	6

== Honours ==
Hammarby

- Svenska Cupen: 2020–21

Individual

- Most Promising Player of the Year in the Ghanaian Premier League: 2016
