= Magnus Wørts =

Danish footballer (born 1999)

Personal information
- Full name: Magnus Finne Wørts
- Date of birth: 8 February 1999 (age 27)
- Height: 1.85 m (6 ft 1 in)
- Position: Midfielder

Youth career
- Veksø IF
- Stenløse BK
- Nordsjælland

Senior career*
Years	Team	Apps	(Gls)
2018–2019	Nordsjælland	0	(0)
2019	→ HB Køge (loan)	9	(0)
2019–2021	HB Køge	50	(0)
2021–2022	Mjällby	21	(0)
- * Club domestic league appearances and goals

Magnus Finne Wørts (born 8 February 1999) is a Danish retired football midfielder. Wørts announced his retirement in July 2022 at the age of 23, as he wanted to pursue a civilian career.
