= Ekin Bulut =

Swedish footballer

Personal information
- Date of birth: 27 September 1996 (age 30)
- Height: 1.80 m (5 ft 11 in)
- Position: Forward

Team information
- Current team: Stockholm Internazionale

Senior career*
Years	Team	Apps	(Gls)
2015–2020	Vasalunds IF	111	(67)
2018	→ Akropolis IF (loan)	10	(0)
2018	→ Nyköpings BIS (loan)	13	(7)
2021	IK Sirius	5	(1)
2021	→ Vasalunds IF (loan)	15	(3)
2022–2023	Norrby	11	(0)
2023–	Stockholm Internazionale	14	(4)
2023	→ Assyriska FF (loan)	8	(4)
- * Club domestic league appearances and goals as of 1 August 2024

Ekin Bulut (born 27 September 1996) is a Swedish football striker who plays for Stockholm Internazionale.

== Club career ==
He became top goalscorer of the 2019 Division 1.

In December 2021, Bulut signed with Norrby for the 2022 season.

From 2023-season, Bulut signed with FC Stockholm Internazionale. He was loaned out to Assyriska FF from August to December.

== Personal life ==
Born in Sweden, Bulut is of Turkish descent.
