= Klostergårdens IP =

Football stadium in Lund, Sweden

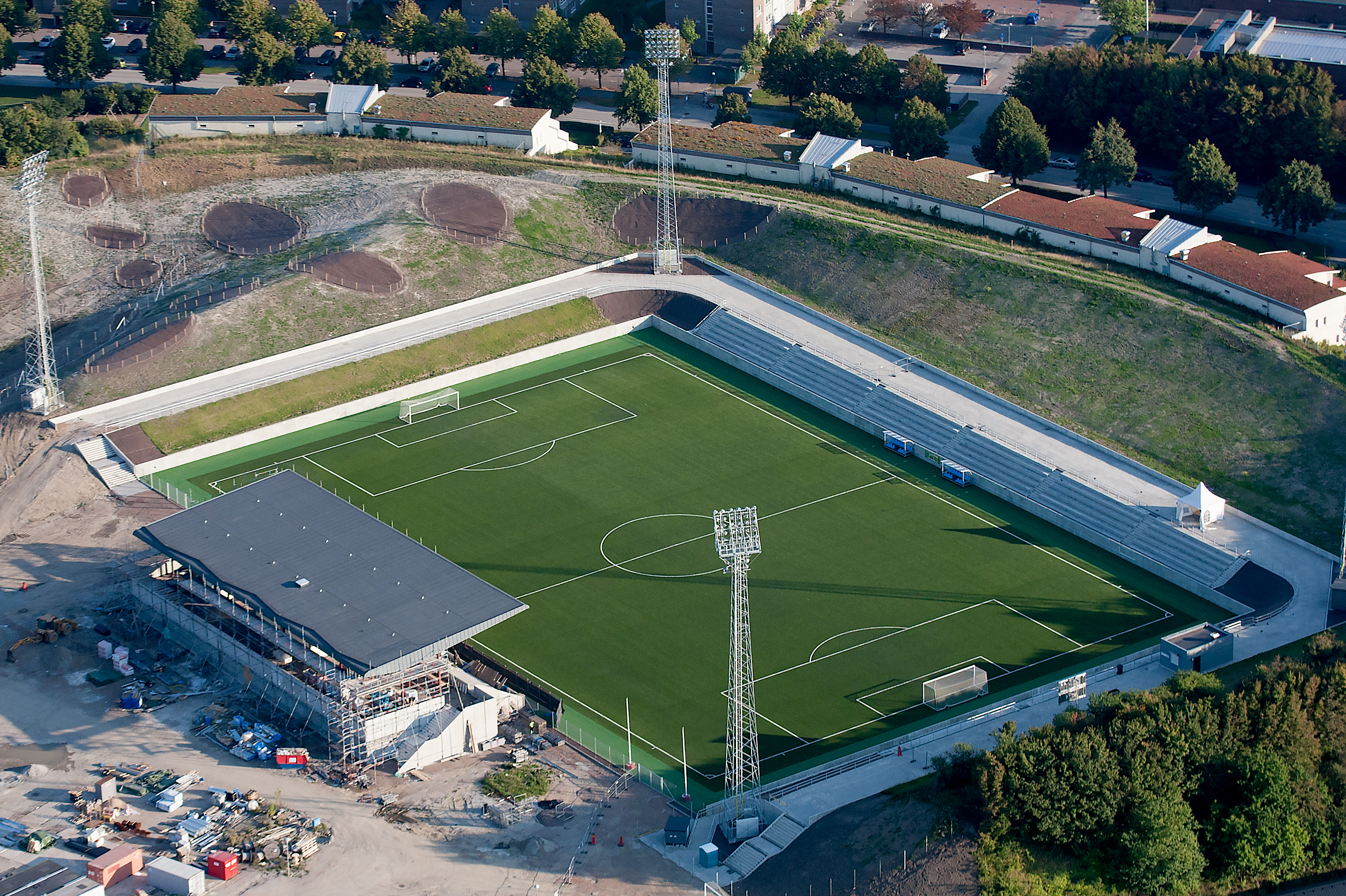
- Klostergårdens IP during renovation in 2014.
- Interactive map of Klostergårdens IP
- Full name: Klostergårdens Idrottsplats
- Location: Klostergårdens Idrottsområde, 222 28 Lund
- Coordinates: 55°41′43″N 13°10′48″E
- Owner: Lund Municipality
- Operator: Lund Municipality
- Capacity: 3,650 (500 seated)
- Surface: Artificial turf
- Field size: 105 by 68 metres (344 ft × 223 ft)

Construction
- Opened: 1968
- Renovated: 2014

Tenants
- Lunds BK; Hallands Nations FF

Klostergårdens IP is an association football stadium in Lund, Sweden and the home stadium of Lunds BK.

== History ==
Klostergårdens IP was built in 1968 and is named after the neighborhood in which it is located. The attendance record of 5,586 spectators was set in 1985 when Lunds BK played Malmö FF in the Swedish Cup. The stadium was renovated in 2014, which lowered the estimated capacity to 3,650 spectators. The main stand seats approximately 500 people, while the rest of the stadium consists of standing-room terraces. During renovation, the grass turf was also replaced with artificial turf.
