= Karlslunds IF FK =

Swedish football club

- Full name: Karlslunds Idrottsförening Fotbollklubb
- Short name: KIF
- Founded: 27 April 1920; 105 years ago
- Ground: Karlslund Arena; Örebro; Sweden
- Capacity: 2,000
- League: Division 1 Norra
- 2019: Division 1 Norra, 10th
- Website: https://www.karlslund.nu/
Home colours	Away colours

Karlslunds IF FK is a Swedish football club located in the Karlslund neighbourhood in western Örebro.

== Background ==
Karlslunds IF's football team has participated mainly in the lower divisions of the Swedish football league system but has enjoyed periods of success most notably an appearance in Division 1 Norra in 2009 and a few seasons in Division 2 in the 1980s. The club currently plays in Division 1 Norra which is the third tier of Swedish football. They play their home matches at the Karlslund Arena in Örebro.

The club is affiliated to the Örebro Läns Fotbollförbund.

== Season to season ==
Season	Level	Division	Section	Position	Movements
1993	Tier 3	Division 2	Västra Svealand	5th	
1994	Tier 3	Division 2	Västra Svealand	6th	
1995	Tier 3	Division 2	Västra Svealand	5th	
1996	Tier 3	Division 2	Västra Svealand	12th	Relegated
1997	Tier 4	Division 3	Västra Svealand	3rd	
1998	Tier 4	Division 3	Västra Svealand	3rd	
1999	Tier 4	Division 3	Västra Svealand	7th	
2000	Tier 4	Division 3	Västra Svealand	6th	
2001	Tier 4	Division 3	Västra Svealand	2nd	Promotion playoffs – promoted
2002	Tier 3	Division 2	Västra Svealand	10th	Relegation playoffs – not relegated
2003	Tier 3	Division 2	Västra Svealand	6th	
2004	Tier 3	Division 2	Västra Svealand	6th	
2005	Tier 3	Division 2	Västra Götaland	12th	Relegated
2006*	Tier 5	Division 3	Västra Svealand	4th	
2007	Tier 5	Division 3	Västra Svealand	1st	Promoted
2008	Tier 4	Division 2	Östra Svealand	1st	Promoted
2009	Tier 3	Division 1	Norra	12th	Relegated
2010	Tier 4	Division 2	Södra Svealand	11th	Relegated
2011	Tier 5	Division 3	Västra Svealand	1st	Promoted
2012	Tier 4	Division 2	Södra Svealand	8th	
2013	Tier 4	Division 2	Norra Götaland	8th	
2014	Tier 4	Division 2	Södra Svealand	10th	
2015	Tier 4	Division 2	Norra Götaland	11th	
2016	Tier 4	Division 2	Södra Svealand	5th	
2017	Tier 4	Division 2	Norra Svealand	2nd	Promotion playoffs – promoted
2018	Tier 3	Division 1	Norra	13th	Relegation playoffs – not relegated
2019	Tier 3	Division 1	Norra		

* League restructuring in 2006 resulted in a new division being created at Tier 3 and subsequent divisions dropping a level.

== Attendances ==
In recent seasons Karlslunds IF FK have had the following average attendances:

Season	Average attendance	Division / Section	Level
2015	166	Div 2 Norra Gotaland	Tier 4
2016	108	Div 2 Sodra Svealand	Tier 4
2017	246	Div 2 Norra Svealand	Tier 4
2018	242	Div 1 Norra	Tier 3

* Attendances are provided in the Publikliga sections of the Svenska Fotbollförbundet website.

== Current squad ==
As of 31 March 2018

Note: Flags indicate national team as defined under FIFA eligibility rules; some limited exceptions apply. Players may hold more than one non-FIFA nationality.

No.	Pos.	Nation	Player
1	GK	GER	Steffen Kraus
2	DF	SWE	Anton Olsson (captain)
3	DF	SWE	Gabriel Kopkin
4	MF	ENG	Laurence Bell
5	DF	SWE	Zakariah Epplette
6	DF	SWE	Felix Bindelöv
7	MF	SWE	Pontus Nordström
8	MF	SWE	Ibrahim Habib
9	MF	SWE	Liridon Jashari Tahiraj
10	FW	SWE	Christer Lipovac
11	FW	SWE	Martin Alp

No.	Pos.	Nation	Player
12	MF	SWE	Carl Grundel
14	MF	SWE	Deniz Yaldir
16	MF	SWE	Simon Esséus
18	FW	SWE	Adam Molin
19	MF	SWE	Daniel Hultqvist
20	MF	SWE	Linus Engwall
35	GK	SWE	Anton Palmér
45	DF	SWE	Carl Ekstrand Hamrén
72	MF	PER	Sebastián Loyola Nydén
92	GK	SWE	Jakob Kindberg
99	FW	SWE	Phillip Amin

== Other sports ==
Since their foundation on 27 April 1920 Karlslunds IF has been active in a number of sports including:

- Bandy – Karlslunds IF BF
- Baseball, softball – KIF Eagles Baseball & Softball
- Bowling – KIF Bowling and Strike & CO Örebro
- Ladies Football – KIF Örebro DFF
- Men's Football – Karlslunds IF HFK
- Gymnastics – Örebro Gymnastikförening – KIF
- Swimming – Örebro Simallians
- Skiing – Karlslunds IF skidor

Karlslunds IF runs the biggest programme for athletics in Örebro, Sweden, with some 4000 members and more than 200 coaches coaching eight different sports. Currently women's soccer (known as KIF Örebro DFF) and men's Nordic skiing are the most successful.
