= Isaac Boye =

Nigerian footballer

Personal information
- Full name: Isaac Boye Edegware
- Date of birth: 5 January 1997 (age 29)
- Place of birth: Sapele, Delta State, Nigeria
- Position: Forward

Youth career
- Academy for Stars

Senior career*
Years	Team	Apps	(Gls)
2017–2021	Örebro	16	(1)
2019	→ Umeå (loan)	28	(12)
2020	→ Ljungskile (loan)	9	(1)
2021	→ IF Karlstad (loan)	26	(11)
2022	IF Karlstad	16	(7)
- * Club domestic league appearances and goals as of 1 January 2023

Isaac Boye Edegware (born 5 January 1997) is a Nigerian footballer who plays as a forward. He played for four different Swedish clubs.

== Career statistics ==
=== Club ===
As of 16 February 2019

Club	Season	League			Cup		Continental		Other		Total	
Club	Season	Division	Apps	Goals	Apps	Goals	Apps	Goals	Apps	Goals	Apps	Goals
Örebro SK	2017	Allsvenskan	0	0	1	0	–		–		1	0
Örebro SK	2018	Allsvenskan	15	1	1	0	–		–		16	1
Örebro SK	2019	Allsvenskan	0	0	1	0	–		–		1	0
Örebro SK	Total		15	1	3	0	0	0	0	0	18	1
Umeå FC (loan)	2019	Division 1	0	0	0	0	–		–		0	0
Career total			15	1	3	0	0	0	0	0	18	1
