= Linus Olsson =

Swedish footballer (born 1991)

Personal information
- Date of birth: 11 November 1991 (age 34)
- Place of birth: Sweden
- Height: 6 ft 0 in (1.83 m)
- Position: Forward

Team information
- Current team: Lunds BK
- Number: 9

Youth career
- Landskrona BoIS

Senior career*
Years	Team	Apps	(Gls)
2010–2012	Landskrona BoIS	43	(2)
2011	→ Högaborgs BK (loan)	15	(10)
2013	Trelleborgs FF	25	(10)
2014–2016	AB	38	(10)
2016	Oklahoma City Energy	11	(2)
2017	Nykøbing FC	14	(4)
2017	Fjölnir	13	(3)
2018	FC Rosengård	19	(9)
2019–2022	Landskrona BoIS	84	(35)
2023–	Lunds BK	53	(16)
- * Club domestic league appearances and goals as of 1 January 2025

Linus Olsson (born 11 November 1991) is a Swedish professional footballer who plays for Lunds BK.
