= Gavlevallen =

Association football stadium in Gävle, Sweden

Coordinates: 60.692153°N 17.135373°E

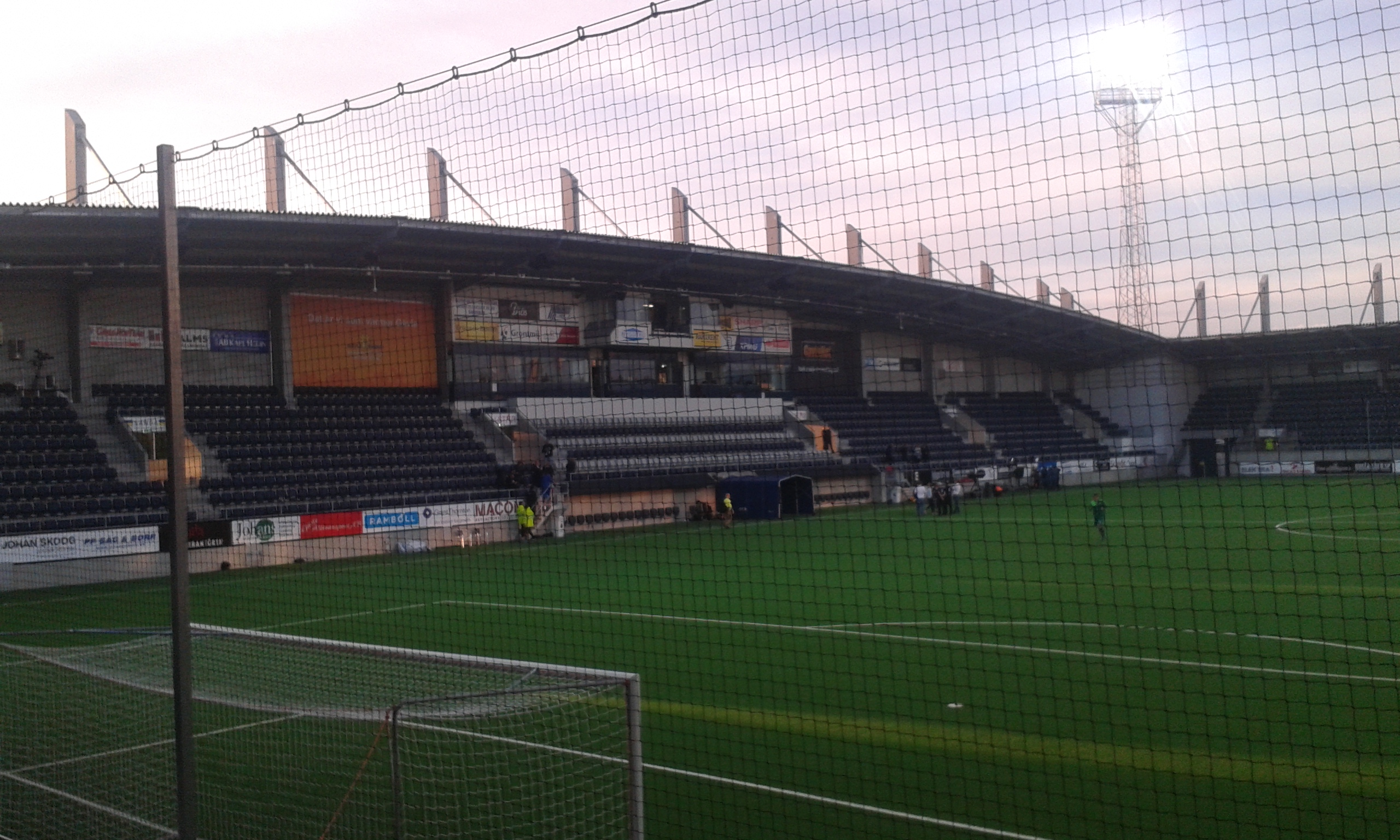
- Gavlevallen
- Interactive map of Gavlevallen
- Location: Gävle, Sweden
- Owner: Gävle Municipality
- Capacity: 6,500
- Surface: Artificial turf

Construction
- Groundbreaking: April 2014
- Built: 2014–2015
- Opened: 20 May 2015
- Cost: 130 million SEK

Tenants
- Gefle IF (2015-present); Dalkurd FF (2018)

Gavlevallen is an association football stadium in Gävle, Sweden. The project was initiated by Allsvenskan side Gefle IF and Gävle Municipality to build a new 6,500 capacity stadium in the Sätraåsen area of Gävle, Sweden.

== History ==
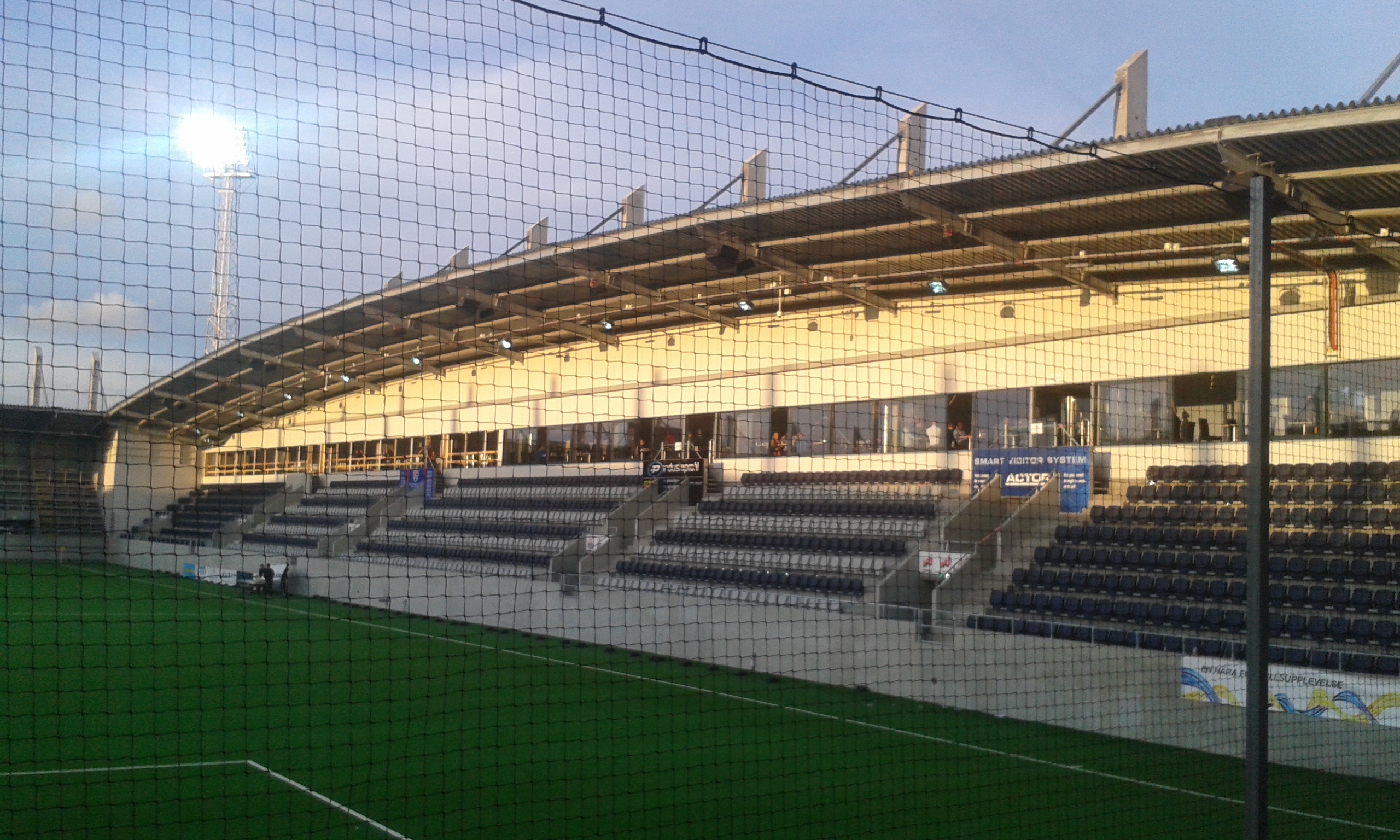
Gavlevallen

A new stadium in Gävle had been discussed for four years prior to the announcement that Gefle IF and Gävle Municipality had agreed. The main reason for building a new stadium is the new stadium criteria by the Swedish Football Association which went into effect in 2014. The new stadium will replace Strömvallen. The stadium was given its name on 30 November 2014 after a public vote initiated by Gävle Municipality had taken place. The first game at Gavlevallen was played on May 20, 2015 when Gefle IF won against GIF Sundsvall (3–1) in Allsvenskan.
