= Andersson =

Andersson is a Swedish language surname, a form of the surname Anderson. Andersson is, if several spelling variants are included, the most common surname in Sweden. Andersson means "Anders's son" or "Andrew's son". Notable people with the surname include:

== A–J ==
- Agneta Andersson (1961–2023), Swedish sprint canoer
- Anders Andersson (disambiguation), various people
- Arne Andersson (1917–2009), Swedish middle-distance runner
- Åsa Andersson (born 1971), Swedish politician
- Augusta Andersson (1856–1938), restaurant owner
- Axel Andersson i Österfärnebo (1897–1979), Swedish politician
- Benny Andersson (born 1946), musician (ABBA)
- Bibi Andersson (1935–2019), Swedish actress
- Birger Andersson (rower) (1925–2004), Finnish rower
- Birger Andersson (tennis) (born 1951), Swedish tennis player
- Birgitta Andersson (1933–2026), Swedish actress and comedian
- Björn Andersson (disambiguation), various people
- Cajsa Andersson (born 1993), Swedish footballer
- Charles John Andersson (1827–1867), traveller
- Cilla Dahl Andersson (born 1971), Swedish politician
- Conny Andersson (disambiguation), various people
- Daniel Andersson, various people
- Earnest Andersson (1878–1943), American polymath
- Edoff Andersson (1902–1934), Swedish politician and trade unionist
- Elin Andersson (born 1981), Swedish politician
- Elsa Andersson (1897–1922), Swedish aviator and stunt parachutist
- Emil Andersson (disambiguation), various people
- Eric Andersson (born 1984), Swedish motorcycle speedway rider
- Erik Andersson (disambiguation), various people
- Eva Andersson (disambiguation), various people
- Georg Andersson (politician) (born 1936), Swedish politician
- Gunnar Andersson (disambiguation), various people
- Gustaf Andersson (1884–1961), Swedish politician
- Håkan Andersson (born 1945), Swedish motocross racer
- Håkan Andersson (born 1965), Swedish amateur hockey scout
- Harriet Andersson (born 1932), Swedish actress
- Heidi Andersson (born 1981), Swedish arm wrestler
- Henrik Andersson (badminton) (born 1977), Swedish badminton player
- Ingemar Andersson (1928–1992), Swedish sprint canoer
- Isak Andersson (born 1996), Swedish hurdler
- Jan Anderson (disambiguation), various people
- Jessica Andersson (born 1973), Swedish singer (Fame)
- Joakim Andersson (diver) (born 1971), Swedish diver
- Joakim Andersson (born 1989), Swedish ice hockey player
- John Andersson, a Swedish football player
- Johan Andersson (disambiguation), various people
- Johan Gunnar Andersson (1874–1960), Swedish archaeologist, paleontologist, geologist and author

== K–Z ==
- Karl Henrik Andersson (1918–1998), Swedish diplomat
- Karl Johan Andersson (1827–1867), Swedish traveller
- Kennet Andersson (born 1967), Swedish footballer
- Kent Andersson (motorcyclist) (1942–2006), Swedish motorcycle racer
- Kim Andersson (born 1982), Swedish professional handball player
- Kjell-Åke Andersson (born 1949), Swedish film director, screenwriter, and cinematographer
- Lars Anderson (disambiguation), various people
- Leo Andersson (born 2004), Finnish footballer
- Li Andersson (born 1987), Finnish politician
- Magdalena Andersson (born 1967), Swedish politician
- Marcus Andersson (born 1987), Swedish politician
- Maria Andersson (businesswoman) (1837–1922)
- Mats Andersson (born 1954), Swedish financier and asset manager
- Mauritz Andersson (1886–1971) Swedish wrestler
- Melina Andersson (born 1999), Swedish canoeist
- Mette Andersson (born 1964), Norwegian sociologist
- Nicke Andersson (born 1972), Swedish musician
- Olga Andersson (1876–1943), Swedish actress
- Olle Andersson (disambiguation), various people
- Ove Andersson (1938–2008), Swedish rally driver
- Patrik Andersson (born 1971), Swedish footballer
- Per-Gunnar Andersson (racing driver) (born 1957), Swedish racing driver
- Per-Gunnar Andersson (rally driver) (born 1980), Swedish rally driver
- Peter Andersson (disambiguation), various people
- Petter Andersson (born 1985), Swedish footballer
- Petra Andersson (born 1993), Swedish footballer
- Rasmus Andersson (born 1996), Swedish ice hockey player
- Robert Andersson Hammarstrand (born 1972), Swedish politician
- Roy Andersson (born 1943), Swedish film director
- Roy Andersson (footballer) (born 1949), Swedish footballer
- Theresa Andersson (born 1971), American musician
- Thorsten Andersson (1923–2018), Swedish toponymist
- Torsten Andersson (1926–2009), Swedish painter
- Ulf Andersson (born 1951), Swedish chess player
- Ville Andersson (born 1972), Finnish footballer and diplomat
