= Peshraw Azizi =

Swedish footballer (born 1988)

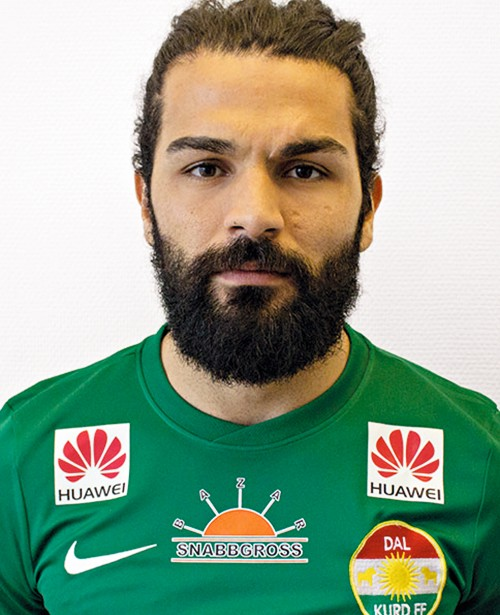
- Azizi in Dalkurd FF jersey, 2016

Personal information
- Full name: Peshraw Azizi
- Date of birth: 19 January 1988 (age 38)
- Place of birth: Sulaymaniyah, Iraq
- Height: 1.78 m (5 ft 10 in)
- Position: Centre back

Team information
- Current team: Vasalund IF
- Number: 21

Youth career
- Rönninge/Salem
- Syrianska

Senior career*
Years	Team	Apps	(Gls)
2007–2011	Syrianska	43	(1)
2009	→ Arameiska-Syrianska (Loan)	9	(1)
2010	→ Valsta Syrianska (Loan)	5	(0)
2011–2019	Dalkurd	163	(12)
2020–	Vasalund IF	40	(1)
- * Club domestic league appearances and goals as of 18:14, 2 August 2021 (UTC)

Peshraw Azizi, born 19 January 1988 in Sulaymaniyah, Iraq, is a Kurdish professional footballer who plays as a centre back for Vasalund IF.

== Early years ==
Peshraw's family comes from the city of Baneh in the Kurdistan province, Iran. After the Iranian revolution, his father Ali hoped for a better future but soon realized that his only path to freedom was to join the Kurdish guerrillas and become Peshmerga. Peshraw's father became politically active, the family settled 60 km away across the "border" in the city of Sulaymaniyah (Iraqi Kurdistan) and where Peshraw was born on Thursday, 19 January 1988.

When Peshraw was 11 years old, the Azizi family decided it was time to leave Kurdistan, and in 2000, the family landed at Arlanda and settled in Rönninge outside Stockholm. His football career took off immediately and quite immediately after Pasha came to Sweden, he visited the local club Rönninge/Salem Fotboll.

== Career ==
=== Dalkurd FF ===
Azizi joined Dalkurd FF in February 2011. In December 2016, Azizi's contract was extended to the end of the 2019 season. On 2 November 2019 Dalkurd confirmed, that Azizi would leave the club at the end of the year.

=== Vasalund IF ===
In 2020, Azizi moved to Vasalund IF on a free transfer. He signed a contract extension with the club at the end of February 2021.

== Personal life ==
Azizi has acquired Swedish nationality, but in 2014 began returning to Kurdistan each year during the Swedish association football off-season. During one such visit, he signed a three-month contract to play for Zeravani SC in the Kurdish League. However, his main reasons for visiting Iraqi Kurdistan are humanitarian. During the summer of 2015, he and a few friends gathered kr 200,000 (US$23711) in Sweden, and then traveled to Kurdistan to apply the funds to charitable projects, such as distributing basic necessities and planting food crops. He is also involved with Dalkurd FF in social projects in their own city of Borlänge, Sweden.
