= 2018 Spengler Cup =

Tournament details
- Host country: Switzerland
- Venue(s): Vaillant Arena
- Dates: 26–31 December 2018
- Teams: 6

Final positions
- Champions: (Finland) KalPa (1st title)
- Runner-up: Team Canada

Tournament statistics
- Games played: 11
- Goals scored: 44 (4 per game)
- Attendance: 65,714 (5,974 per game)
- Scoring leader(s): (Germany) Leonhard Pföderl (5 points)

Official website
- Spengler Cup

The 2018 Spengler Cup was held from December 26 to December 31, 2018 at the Vaillant Arena, in Davos, Switzerland.

== Teams participating ==
- Team Canada
- (Czech Republic) HC Oceláři Třinec
- (Finland) KalPa
- (Germany) Thomas Sabo Ice Tigers
- (Russia) Metallurg Magnitogorsk
- (Switzerland) HC Davos (host)

== Group stage ==
All times are local (UTC+1).

=== Group Cattini ===
| Pos | Team | Pld | W | OTW | OTL | L | GF | GA | GD | Pts | Qualification |
|---|---|---|---|---|---|---|---|---|---|---|---|
| 1 | Team Canada | 2 | 2 | 0 | 0 | 0 | 8 | 3 | +5 | 6 | Semifinals |
| 2 | (Switzerland) HC Davos (H) | 2 | 1 | 0 | 0 | 1 | 4 | 4 | 0 | 3 | Quarterfinals |
| 3 | (Germany) Thomas Sabo Ice Tigers | 2 | 0 | 0 | 0 | 2 | 4 | 9 | −5 | 0 | Quarterfinals |

(H) Host

| 26 December 2018; 20:15 | HC Davos (Switzerland) | 1–2 (0–1, 1–1, 0–0) | Team Canada | Vaillant Arena; Attendance: 6,300 |

Game reference

Anders Lindbäck
Goalies
Zachary Fucale
Referees:
(Switzerland) Daniel Stricker
(Canada) Brad Watson
Linesmen:
(Switzerland) Franco Castelli
(Switzerland) Marc-Henri Progin

| | 0–1 | 05:24 – Boychuk (Després, Dalpe) |
| | 0–2 | 23:43 – D'Agostini (Ebbett, Winnik) |
| Bader – 38:06 | 1–2 |

22 min
Penalties
8 min
25
Shots
36

| 27 December 2018; 20:15 | Thomas Sabo Ice Tigers (Germany) | 2–3 (0–2, 1–0, 1–1) | (Switzerland) HC Davos | Vaillant Arena; Attendance: 6,300 |

Game reference

Niklas Treutle
Goalies
Gilles Senn
Referees:
(Switzerland) Micha Hebeisen
(Canada) Brad Watson
Linesmen:
(Switzerland) Dario Fuchs
(Switzerland) Simon Wüst

| | 0–1 | 05:32 – Pestoni (Jung, Heldner) |
| | 0–2 | 06:36 – Simion (Klasen, Ambühl) |
| Buck (Bast, Aronson) – 36:57 | 1–2 |
| Pföderl (Gilbert, Dupuis) (PP) – 48:37 | 2–2 |
| | 2–3 | 51:43 – Payr (Klasen, Ambühl) |

8 min
Penalties
6 min
35
Shots
29

| 28 December 2018; 20:15 | Team Canada | 6–2 (1–0, 4–1, 1–1) | (Germany) Thomas Sabo Ice Tigers | Vaillant Arena; Attendance: 6,300 |

Game reference

Zachary Fucale
Goalies
Andreas Jenike
Referees:
(Canada) Brad Watson
(Switzerland) Marc Wiegand
Linesmen:
(Switzerland) Marc-Henri Progin
(Switzerland) Simon Wüst

| Fabbro (Moore, Conrad) – 02:21 | 1–0 |
| | 1–1 | 20:52 – Reimer (Pföderl, Dupuis) (PP) |
| Winnik (Wiercioch, Knelsen) – 24:52 | 2–1 |
| Ebbett (D'Agostini, DiDomenico) – 31:14 | 3–1 |
| Dalpe (Winnik) – 33:01 | 4–1 |
| Knelsen (Lapierre, Moore) – 37:45 | 5–1 |
| Fabbro (Lapierre, Noreau) – 48:37 | 6–1 |
| | 6–2 | 57:54 – Mieszkowski (Brown, Jurčina) |

10 min
Penalties
8 min
39
Shots
21

=== Group Torriani ===
| Pos | Team | Pld | W | OTW | OTL | L | GF | GA | GD | Pts | Qualification |
|---|---|---|---|---|---|---|---|---|---|---|---|
| 1 | (Finland) KalPa | 2 | 1 | 1 | 0 | 0 | 4 | 1 | +3 | 5 | Semifinals |
| 2 | (Russia) Metallurg Magnitogorsk | 2 | 0 | 1 | 1 | 0 | 2 | 2 | 0 | 3 | Quarterfinals |
| 3 | (Czech Republic) HC Oceláři Třinec | 2 | 0 | 0 | 1 | 1 | 2 | 5 | −3 | 1 | Quarterfinals |

| 26 December 2018; 15:10 | HC Oceláři Třinec (Czech Republic) | 1–2 GWS (0–0, 1–0, 0–1) (OT: 0–0) (SO: 0–1) | (Russia) Metallurg Magnitogorsk | Vaillant Arena; Attendance: 5,359 |

Game reference
| Šimon Hrubec | Goalies | Artyom Zagidulin | Referees: (Switzerland) Micha Hebeisen (Switzerland) Marc Wiegand; Linesmen: (Switzerland) Stany Gnemmi (Switzerland) Simon Wüst |
| Adamský (Roth, Svačina) (PP) – 22:58 / 1–0; / 1–1 / 52:55 – Matushkin (Rasmussen, Pakarinen) | | | Referees: (Switzerland) Micha Hebeisen (Switzerland) Marc Wiegand; Linesmen: (Switzerland) Stany Gnemmi (Switzerland) Simon Wüst |
| Růžička (miss); Bukarts (miss); Polanský (miss) | Shootout | Lyubimov; (miss) Pakarinen; (miss) Matushkin | Referees: (Switzerland) Micha Hebeisen (Switzerland) Marc Wiegand; Linesmen: (Switzerland) Stany Gnemmi (Switzerland) Simon Wüst |
| 8 min | Penalties | 4 min | Referees: (Switzerland) Micha Hebeisen (Switzerland) Marc Wiegand; Linesmen: (Switzerland) Stany Gnemmi (Switzerland) Simon Wüst |
| 22 | Shots | 32 | Referees: (Switzerland) Micha Hebeisen (Switzerland) Marc Wiegand; Linesmen: (Switzerland) Stany Gnemmi (Switzerland) Simon Wüst |

| 27 December 2018; 15:10 | KalPa (Finland) | 3–1 (1–0, 1–1, 1–0) | (Czech Republic) HC Oceláři Třinec | Vaillant Arena; Attendance: 5,141 |

Game reference

Denis Godla
Goalies
Lukáš Daneček
Referees:
(Russia) Roman Gofman
(Switzerland) Daniel Stricker
Linesmen:
(Switzerland) Franco Castelli
(Switzerland) Stany Gnemmi

| Ruuttu (Rissanen, Texier) – 12:06 | 1–0 |
| | 1–1 | 32:26 – Gernát (Bukarts) |
| Texier (Ruuttu) – 33:19 | 2–1 |
| Ruuttu – 40:32 | 3–1 |

8 min
Penalties
12 min
24
Shots
30

| 28 December 2018; 15:10 | Metallurg Magnitogorsk (Russia) | 0–1 OT (0–0, 0–0, 0–0) (OT: 0–1) | (Finland) KalPa | Vaillant Arena; Attendance: 5,509 |

Game reference
| Artyom Zagidulin | Goalies | Daniel Manzato | Referees: (Russia) Roman Gofman (Switzerland) Micha Hebeisen; Linesmen: (Switzerland) Dario Fuchs (Switzerland) Stany Gnemmi |
| 0–1 / 62:47 – Jokinen (Rissanen, Leskinen) | | | Referees: (Russia) Roman Gofman (Switzerland) Micha Hebeisen; Linesmen: (Switzerland) Dario Fuchs (Switzerland) Stany Gnemmi |
| 6 min | Penalties | 6 min | Referees: (Russia) Roman Gofman (Switzerland) Micha Hebeisen; Linesmen: (Switzerland) Dario Fuchs (Switzerland) Stany Gnemmi |
| 18 | Shots | 27 | Referees: (Russia) Roman Gofman (Switzerland) Micha Hebeisen; Linesmen: (Switzerland) Dario Fuchs (Switzerland) Stany Gnemmi |

== Knockout stage ==
=== Bracket ===
Quarterfinals
29 December
(Russia) Metallurg Magnitogorsk | 1
(Germany) Thomas Sabo Ice Tigers | 3
29 December
(Switzerland) HC Davos | 3
(Czech Republic) HC Oceláři Třinec | 1

Semifinals
30 December
Team Canada | 4
(Germany) Thomas Sabo Ice Tigers | 2
30 December
(Finland) KalPa | 2
(Switzerland) HC Davos | 1

Final
31 December
Team Canada | 1
(Finland) KalPa (GWS) | 2

=== Quarterfinals ===
| 29 December 2018; 15:10 | Metallurg Magnitogorsk (Russia) | 1–3 (0–1, 1–2, 0–0) | (Germany) Thomas Sabo Ice Tigers | Vaillant Arena; Attendance: 5,605 |

Game reference

Artyom Zagidulin
Pavel Nechistovsky
Goalies
Niklas Treutle
Referees:
(Switzerland) Daniel Stricker
(Switzerland) Marc Wiegand
Linesmen:
(Switzerland) Franco Castelli
(Switzerland) Dario Fuchs

| | 0–1 | 04:06 – Reimer (Weiß) |
| Kulemin (Varfolomeyev) (PP) – 21:04 | 1–1 |
| | 1–2 | 26:29 – Buck (Acton, Lalonde) (PP) |
| | 1–3 | 28:28 – Pföderl (Reimer, Weiß) |

6 min
Penalties
26 min
30
Shots
23

| 29 December 2018; 20:15 | HC Davos (Switzerland) | 3–1 (1–0, 0–1, 2–0) | (Czech Republic) HC Oceláři Třinec | Vaillant Arena; Attendance: 6,300 |

Game reference

Anders Lindbäck
Goalies
Šimon Hrubec
Referees:
(Russia) Roman Gofman
(Switzerland) Micha Hebeisen
Linesmen:
(Switzerland) Stany Gnemmi
(Switzerland) Marc-Henri Progin

| Klasen (Simion, Heldner) – 14:18 | 1–0 |
| | 1–1 | 36:18 – Kovařčík (Krajíček) |
| Klasen (Ambühl, Simion) – 47:34 | 2–1 |
| Wieser (ENG) – 59:59 | 3–1 |

8 min
Penalties
14 min
27
Shots
28

=== Semifinals ===
| 30 December 2018; 15:10 | Team Canada | 4–2 (3–0, 1–1, 0–1) | (Germany) Thomas Sabo Ice Tigers | Vaillant Arena; Attendance: 6,300 |

Game reference

Zach Fucale
Goalies
Niklas Treutle
Referees:
(Switzerland) Daniel Stricker
(Switzerland) Marc Wiegand
Linesmen:
(Switzerland) Franco Castelli
(Switzerland) Marc-Henri Progin

| Emmerton (Boychuk, Fabbro) – 07:06 | 1–0 |
| Boychuk (Emmerton) – 09:39 | 2–0 |
| Boychuk (Norreau, Micflikier) – 12:45 | 3–0 |
| DiDomenico (Ebbett, Noreau) (PP) – 22:30 | 4–0 |
| | 4–1 | 31:32 – Weiß (Pföderl, Gilbert) (PP) |
| | 4–2 | 55:07 – Buck (Bender, Pföderl) |

8 min
Penalties
12 min
33
Shots
17

| 30 December 2018; 20:15 | KalPa (Finland) | 2–1 (1–0, 0–0, 1–1) | (Switzerland) HC Davos | Vaillant Arena; Attendance: 6,300 |

Game reference

Daniel Manzato
Goalies
Gilles Senn
Referees:
(Russia) Roman Gofman
(Canada) Brad Watson
Linesmen:
(Switzerland) Dario Fuchs
(Switzerland) Simon Wüst

| Nousianen (Mäkinen) – 02:11 | 1–0 |
| | 1–1 | 45:47 – Frehner (Jung, Aeschlimann) |
| Rissanen (Texier, Ruuttu) – 50:37 | 2–1 |

2 min
Penalties
2 min
28
Shots
22

=== Final ===
| 31 December 2018; 12:10 | Team Canada | 1–2 GWS (0–0, 0–0, 1–1) (OT: 0–0) (SO: 0–1) | (Finland) KalPa | Vaillant Arena; Attendance: 6,300 |

Game reference
| Zachary Fucale | Goalies | Denis Godla | Referees: (Canada) Brad Watson (Switzerland) Marc Wiegand; Linesmen: (Switzerland) Marc-Henri Progin (Switzerland) Simon Wüst |
| Winnik (Mitchell, Cracknell) – 45:16 / 1–0; / 1–1 / 51:24 – Luostarinen (Lappalainen, Nuutinen) | | | Referees: (Canada) Brad Watson (Switzerland) Marc Wiegand; Linesmen: (Switzerland) Marc-Henri Progin (Switzerland) Simon Wüst |
| Boychuk; Lapierre (miss); Emmerton; DiDomenico (miss); Boychuk (miss); Dalpe (miss); Emmerton (miss); Ebbett (miss) | Shootout | Vainiola; Texier; (miss) Luostarinen; (miss) Texier; (miss) Vainiola; (miss) Ruuttu; (miss) Texier; Rissanen | Referees: (Canada) Brad Watson (Switzerland) Marc Wiegand; Linesmen: (Switzerland) Marc-Henri Progin (Switzerland) Simon Wüst |
| 10 min | Penalties | 10 min | Referees: (Canada) Brad Watson (Switzerland) Marc Wiegand; Linesmen: (Switzerland) Marc-Henri Progin (Switzerland) Simon Wüst |
| 40 | Shots | 24 | Referees: (Canada) Brad Watson (Switzerland) Marc Wiegand; Linesmen: (Switzerland) Marc-Henri Progin (Switzerland) Simon Wüst |

== All-Star Team ==
| Position | Player | Team |
|---|---|---|
| Goaltender | (Switzerland) Daniel Manzato | (Finland) KalPa |
| Defencemen | (Canada) Dante Fabbro | Team Canada |
| Defencemen | (Finland) Kim Nousiainen | (Finland) KalPa |
| Forwards | (Sweden) Linus Klasen | (Switzerland) HC Davos |
| Forwards | (Canada) Zach Boychuk | Team Canada |
| Forwards | (Germany) Leonhard Pföderl | (Germany) Thomas Sabo Ice Tigers |
