= Salem Municipality =

Salem Municipality Salems kommun
- Municipality
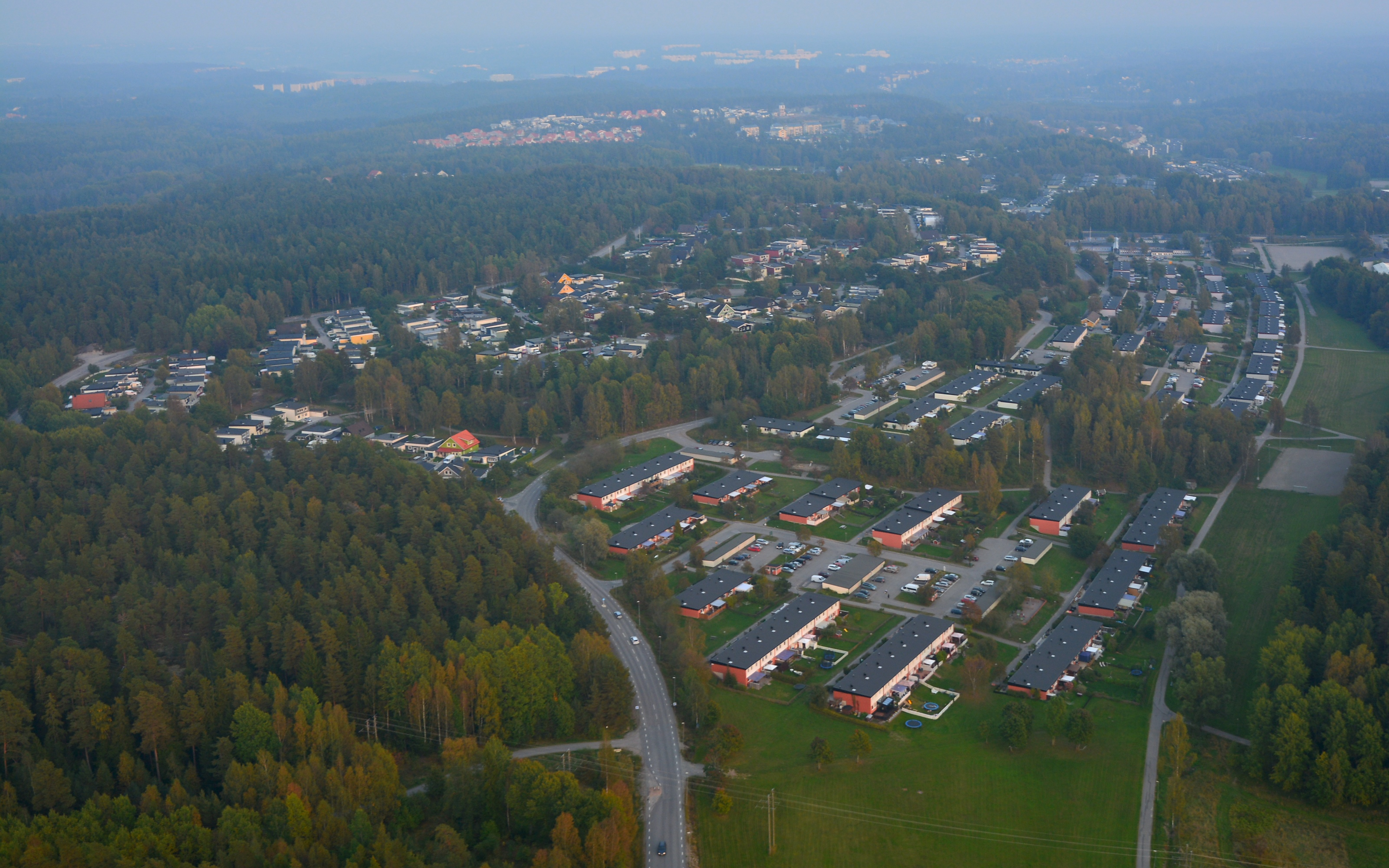

- Coat of arms

- Coordinates: 59°12′N 17°46′E
- Country: Sweden
- County: Stockholm County
- Seat: Salem

Area
  - Total: 71.09 km^{2} (27.45 sq mi)
  - Land: 54.09 km^{2} (20.88 sq mi)
  - Water: 17 km^{2} (6.6 sq mi)
- Area as of 1 January 2014.

Population (30 June 2025)
  - Total: 17,475
  - Density: 323.1/km^{2} (836.8/sq mi)
- Demonyms: Salemite
- Time zone: UTC+1 (CET)
  - Summer (DST): UTC+2 (CEST)
- ISO 3166 code: SE
- Province: Södermanland
- Municipal code: 0128
- Website: www.salem.se
- Density is calculated using land area only.

Salem Municipality (Swedish: Salems kommun) is a municipality in Stockholm County in east central Sweden. The name traces its origins from Slæm in the 13th century, but was changed to Salem in the 17th century, inspired by the Biblical name of Jerusalem. Its seat is located in Salem.

== History ==
Like the rest of the areas around Lake Mälaren, Salem has a significant amount of ancient remains, as far back as the Stone Age. The church of Salem traces its foundation to the 12th century. The oldest historical monument in Salem is a church that dates back to the early 12th century.

Just like its eastern municipal neighbour Botkyrka, Salem traces its history back to the legendary Saint Botvid, who lived in the area sometime between 1050 and 1120. In the medieval tradition, a spring would always be found in connection to the death of a saint. According to legend, when the remains of Saint Botvid were transported to the church in today's Botkyrka, the casket was temporarily put down near the shore of Lake Bornsjön, where a spring poured up. It continues to provide clear water to this day. The parish name "Slaem" was mentioned for the first time in a letter written by King Magnus Ladulås in 1283. The current name (inspired by the one in the Bible) of the municipality became commonly used during the 17th century, although it was referenced 50 years earlier.

== Today ==
Salem was united with the municipality of Botkyrka during the Swedish municipal reform between 1971 and 1974. However, in 1983, after energetic protests, they were split apart, and Salem became the 14th smallest municipality by area in the country.

Salem is served by one station, Rönninge, on the commuter train line between Södertälje and Märsta via Stockholm. There are also a good network of bus lines.

The number of people in Salem is about 30% less during day time due to that it has the biggest percentage of people in Stockholm county that work outside own municipal.

== Demography ==
=== Population development ===
Population development in Salem Municipality 1970–2019
Year	Population
1970	11,951
1975	12,703
1980	12,879
1985	12,370
1990	12,478
1995	12,871
2000	13,766
2005	14,334
2010	15,391
2015	16,426
2017	16,665
2019	16,750
Source: SCB - Folkmängd efter region och år.

=== 2022 population by district ===
This is a demographic table based on Salem Municipality's electoral districts in the 2022 Swedish general election sourced from SVT's election platform, in turn taken from SCB official statistics.

Residents include everyone registered as living in the district, regardless of age or citizenship status. Valid voters indicate Swedish citizens above the age of 18 who therefore can vote in general elections. Left vote and right vote indicate the result between the two major blocs in said district in the 2022 general election. Employment indicates the share of people between the ages of 20 and 64 who are working taxpayers. Foreign background is defined as residents either born abroad or with two parents born outside of Sweden. Median income is the received monthly income through either employment, capital gains or social grants for the median adult above 20, also including pensioners in Swedish kronor. The section about college graduates indicates any degree accumulated after high school.

In total there were 17,219 residents, including 11,967 Swedish citizens of voting age. 44.3% voted for the left coalition and 54.2% for the right coalition. Indicators are in percentage points except population totals and income.

Location	Residents	Citizen adults	Left vote	Right vote	Employed	Swedish parents	Foreign heritage	Income SEK	Degree
Location			%	%					
1 Rönninge N	1,907	1,322	41.7	57.0	86	81	19	35,072	58
2 Rönninge SÖ	1,639	1,165	50.5	48.4	90	82	18	39,458	65
3 Salem V	1,996	1,356	45.1	53.6	82	65	35	27,711	36
4 Salem C	1,904	1,462	45.5	53.2	81	65	35	23,967	33
5 Salem N	1,900	1,302	40.2	58.4	80	56	44	28,133	37
6 Rönninge C	1,559	1,199	45.8	52.7	86	73	27	29,770	49
7 Salem S	2,221	1,458	46.3	51.4	75	53	47	24,609	34
8 Salem Ö	2,493	1,595	37.7	60.9	83	61	39	29,836	41
9 Rönninge SV	1,600	1,108	48.6	51.1	87	84	16	39,164	65
Source: SVT

=== Residents with a foreign background ===
In 2017 the number of people with a foreign background (persons born outside of Sweden or with two parents born outside of Sweden) was 4 643, or 27.86% of the population (16 665 in 2017). In 2002 the number of residents with a foreign background was (per the same definition) 2 468, or 17.79% of the population (13 875 in 2002). In 2017 there were 16 665 residents in Salem, of which 3 270 people (19.62%) were born in a country other than Sweden. Divided by country in the table below - the Nordic countries as well as the 12 most common countries of birth outside of Sweden for Swedish residents have been included, with other countries of birth bundled together by continent by Statistics Sweden.

Country of birth
31 December 2017
1	Sweden	13,395
2	Finland	425
3	European Union: Other countries	417
4	Asia: Other countries	358
5	Syria	358
6	Iraq	326
7	Poland	231
8	South America	211
9	Africa: Other countries	156
10	Europe outside of the EU: other countries	124
11	Germany	95
12	Thailand	87
13	North America	69
14	Afghanistan	67
15	Yugoslavia/Yugoslavia; SFR Yugoslavia/Serbia and Montenegro	64
16	Turkey	58
17	Eritrea	50
18	Norway	43
19	Iran	40
20	Bosnia and Herzegovina	35
21	Denmark	30
22	Somalia	15
23	Oceania	7
24	Iceland	2
25	Soviet Union	2

== Notable people ==
- Mikael Ahlén (born 1988), ice hockey player
- Edoff Andersson (1902–1934), politician and trade unionist
- Sture Ericson (1912–1979), actor
- Erik Hassle (born 1988), singer and songwriter
- Jonas Karlsson (born 1971), actor and author
- Mikael Lindnord (born 1976), athlete, author, director, coach, lecturer and entrepreneur
- Edward Malm (1899–1983), army officer
- Henrik Nilsson (ice hockey, born 1970)
- Marcus Rafferty (born 2004), footballer
- Åsa Romson (born 1972), politician
- Sarah Sjöström (born 1993), swimmer and Olympic medalist
