= Salem, Sweden =

Seat of Salem Municipality, Stockholm County, Sweden

Coordinates: 59°12′N 17°46′E

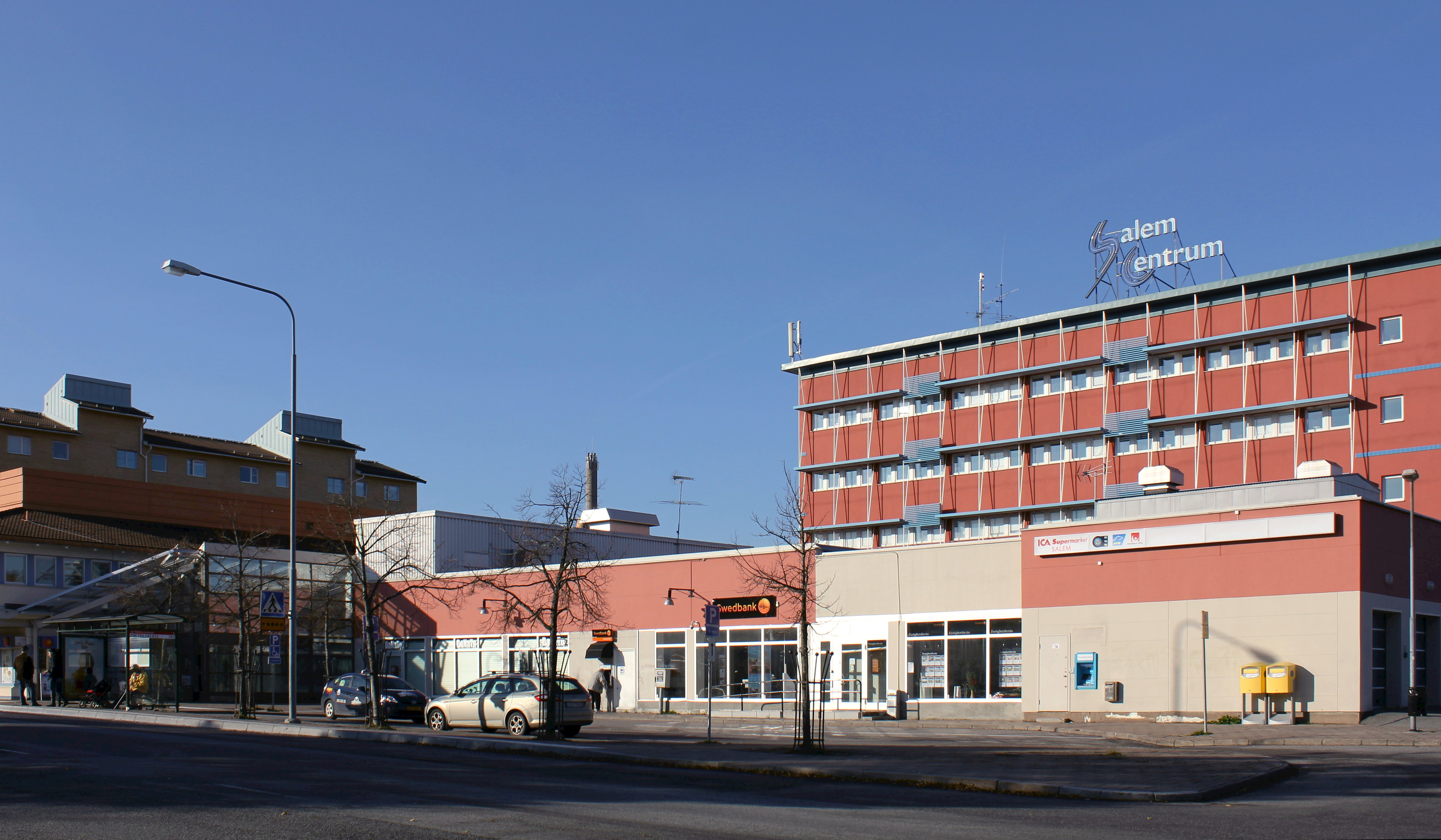
Central Salem

Salem (Swedish pronunciation: [ˈsɑ̌ːlɛm]) is the seat of Salem Municipality, Stockholm County, Sweden. Statistically it is a part of the bimunicipal contiguously built-up Tumba urban area.

== Notable people ==
- Edoff Andersson (1902–1934), Swedish politician and trade unionist
