= Segersjö =

- Suburb
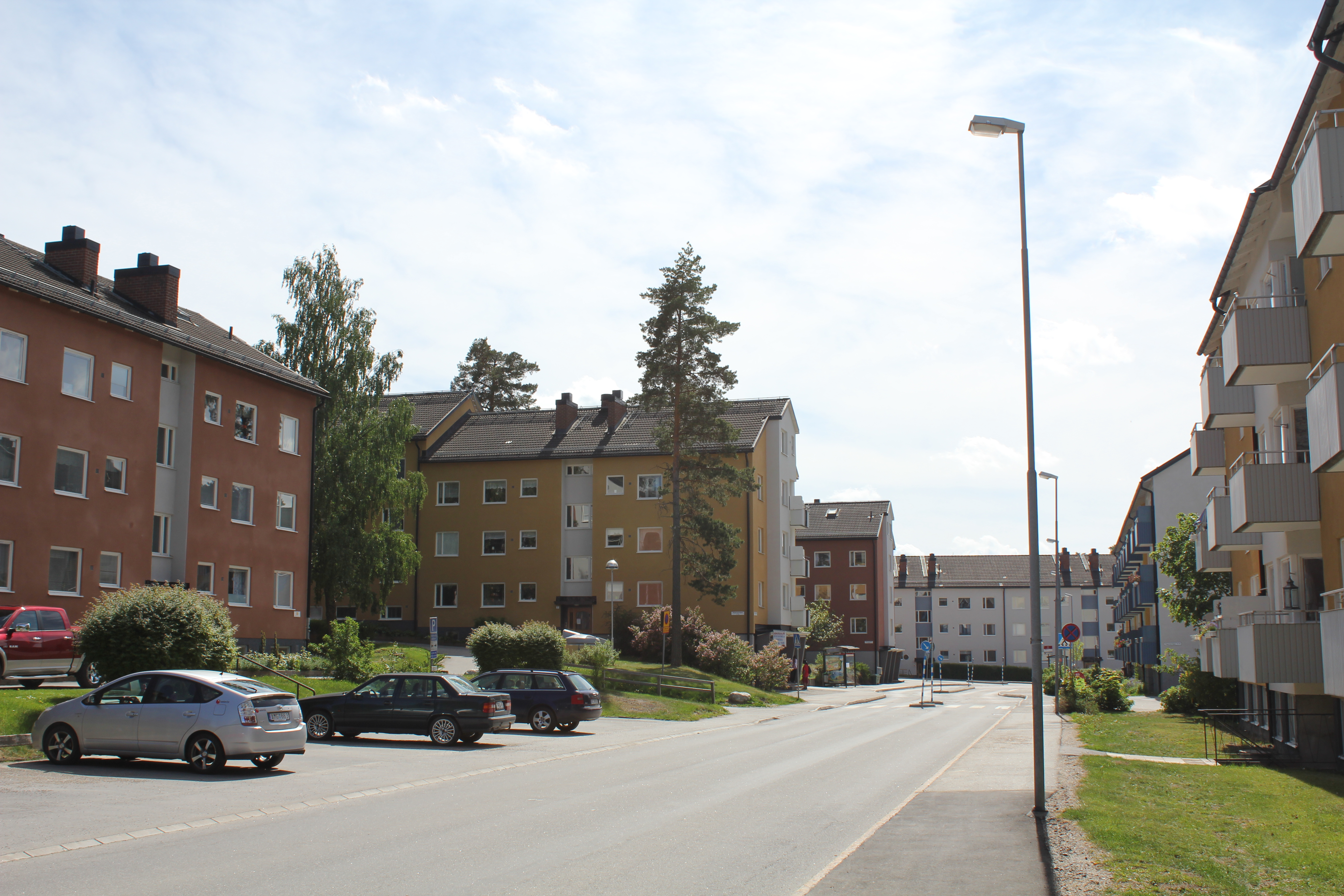

- Location in Stockholm County
- Coordinates: 59°11′42″N 17°48′45″E
- Country: Sweden
- County: Stockholm County
- Municipality: Botkyrka Municipality
- Time zone: UTC+1 (CET)
  - Summer (DST): UTC+2 (CEST)

Segersjö is a suburb of Tumba in Botkyrka Municipality, Stockholm County, southeastern Sweden.

== Gallery ==
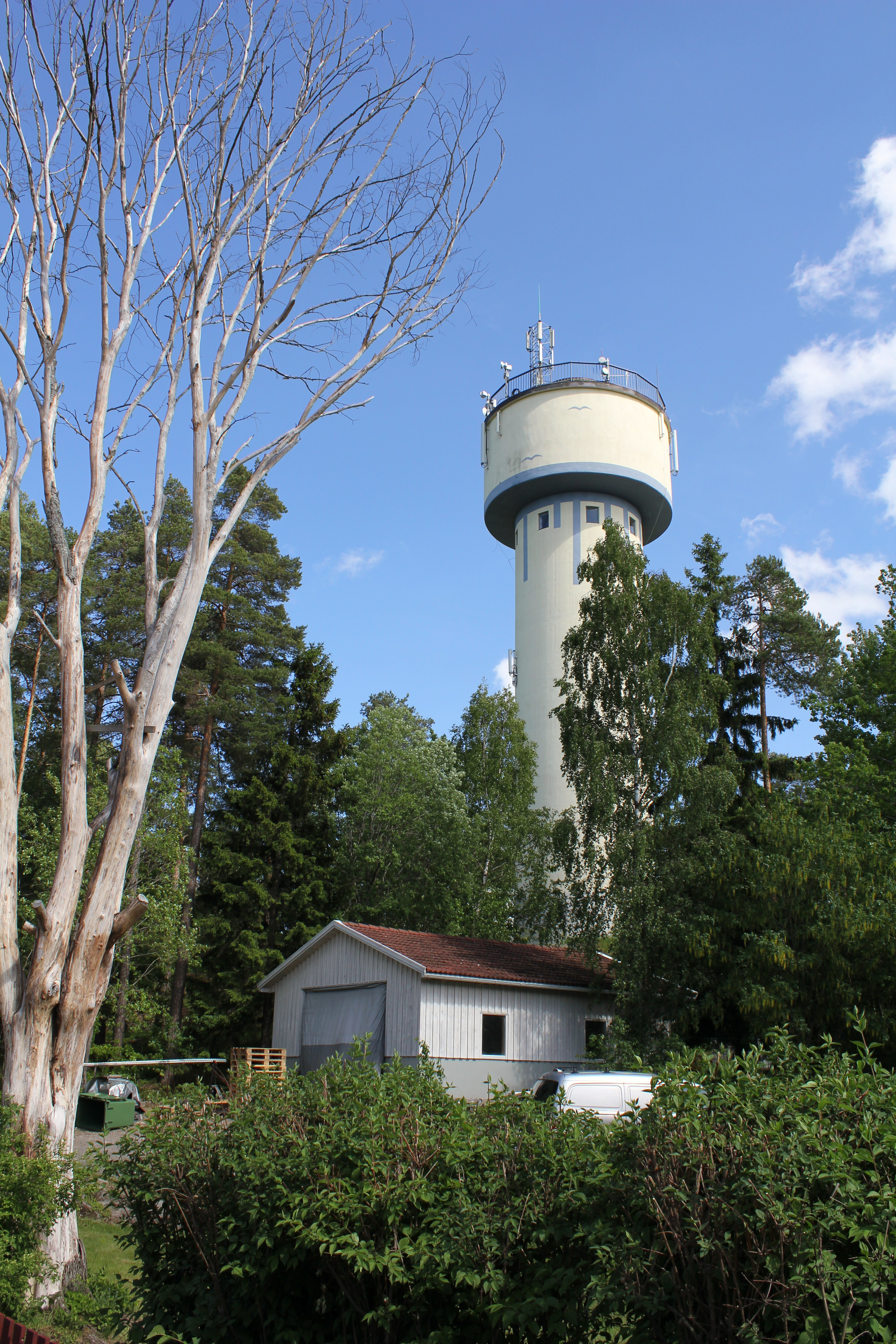
Vattentornet i Segersjö

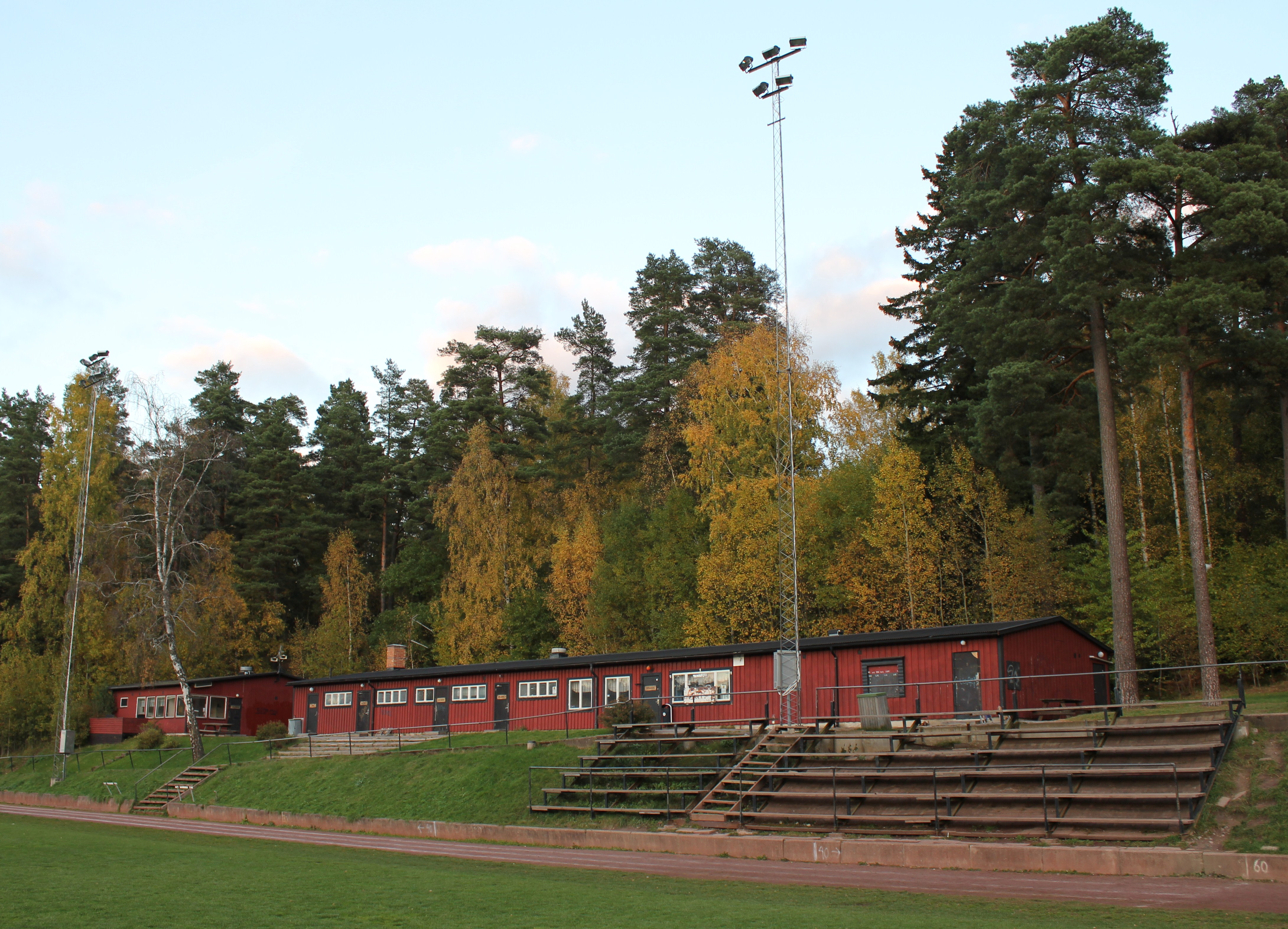
Rödstu hage

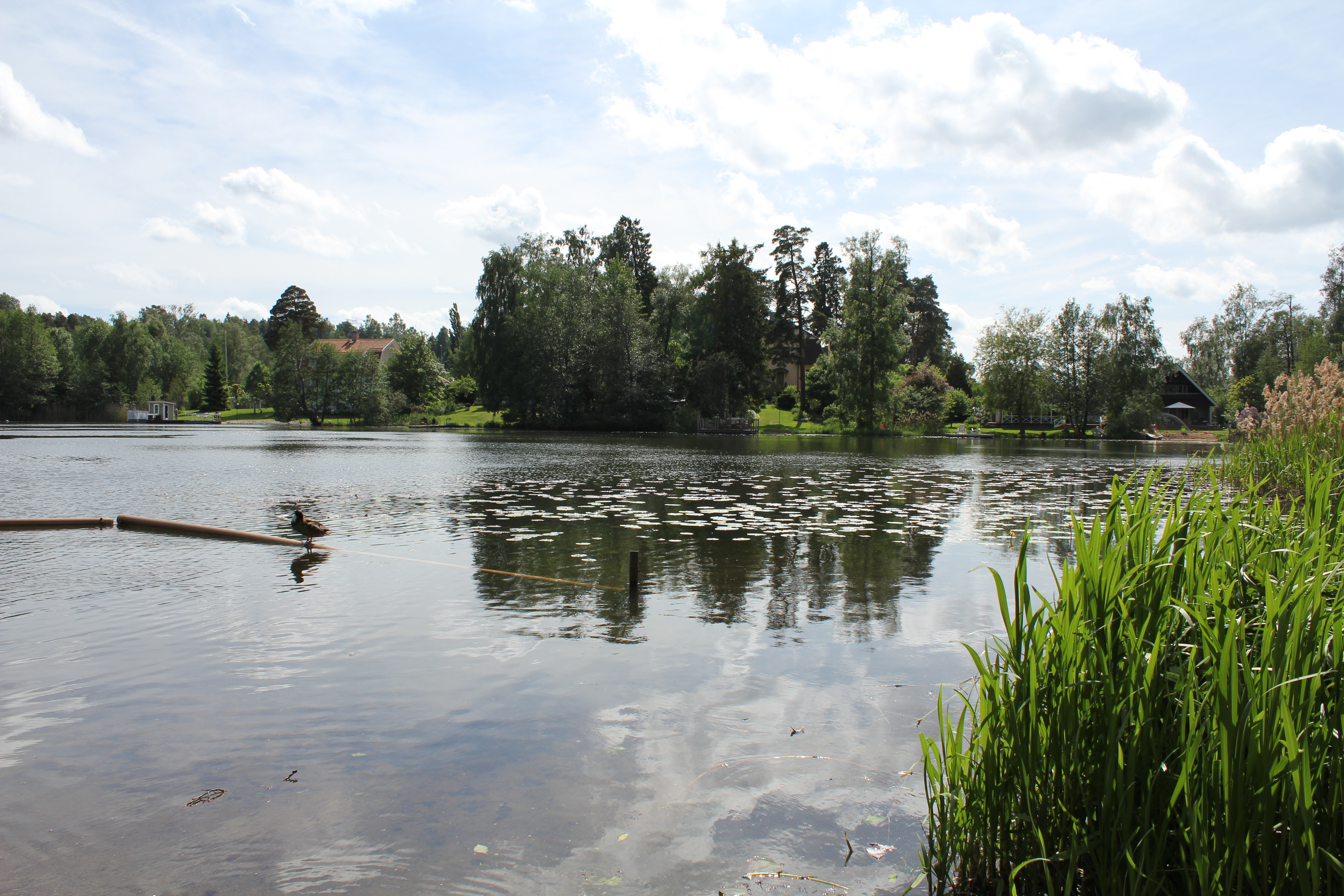
Segersjön, vy från Segersjö mot Uttran

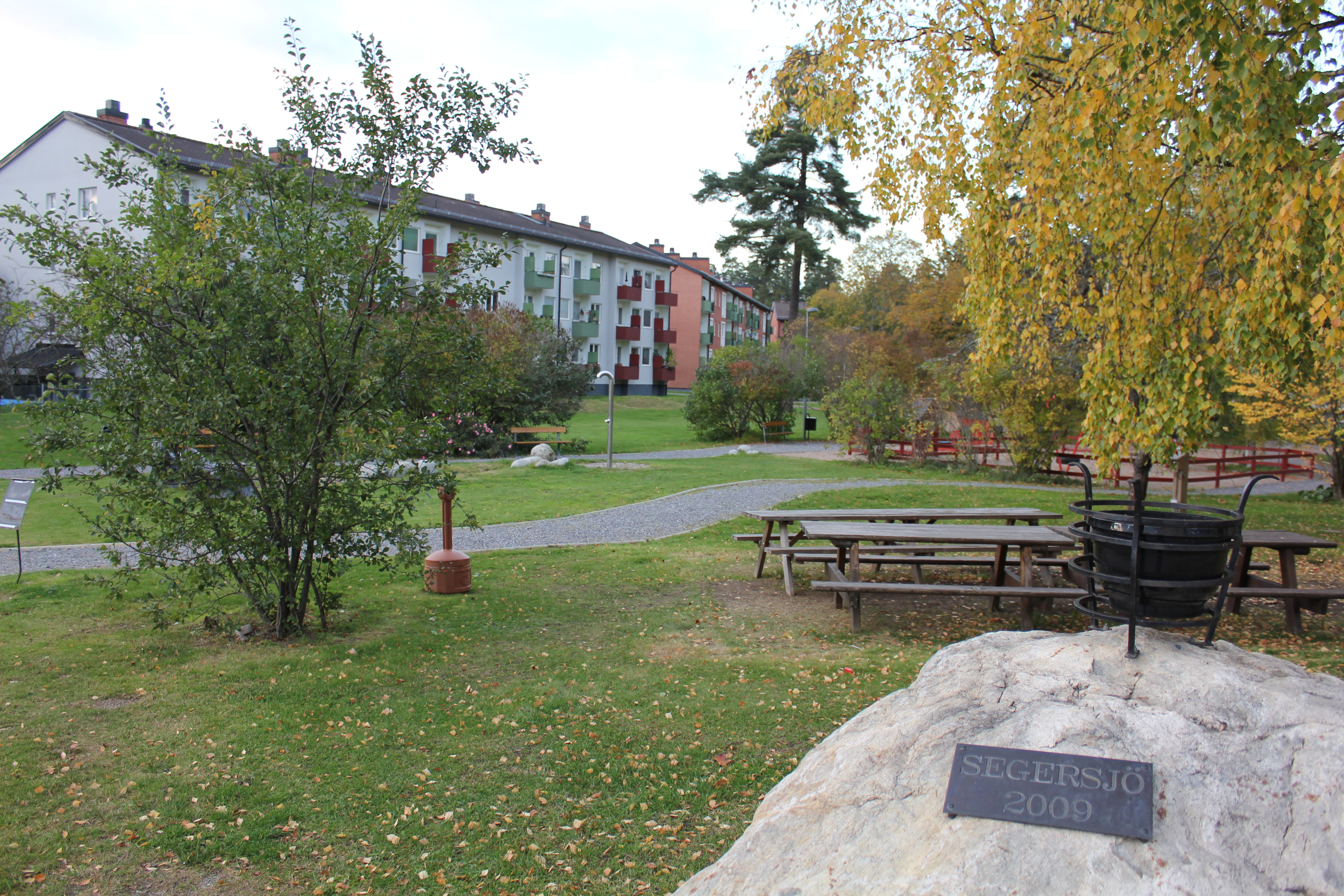
Segersjöparken
