= Bjørn Andersen =

Bjørn Andersen may refer to:

- Bjørn G. Andersen (1924–2012), Norwegian geologist and glaciologist
- Bjørn Bang Andersen (born 1937), Norwegian shot putter
- Bjørn Odmar Andersen (1943–2008), Norwegian footballer
- Alice Bjorn Andersen, Danish beauty queen in Miss International 1964
- Bjørn Andersen, Danish table tennis player, winner of Denmark Open in 1968–69
- Henrik B. Andersen (Henrik Bjørn Andersen, born 1958), Danish sculptor
- Bjørn Willberg Andersen, Norwegian actor in 1994 frama film Dreamplay
- Jens Bjørn Andersen, CEO of DSV since 2008
- Bjørn Andersen (politician) (1944–1994)
- Bjørn Andersen (pole vaulter) (1931–2006), Danish Olympic athlete

== See also ==
- Michelle Bjørn-Andersen (born 1954), Danish actress, nominated for Bodil Award for Best Actress in a Leading Role in 1996, played in 2001 film One-Hand Clapping and 2005 film Dark Horse
- Niels Bjørn-Andersen, winner of Leo award in 2006, see Association for Information Systems
- Bjorn Anderson (disambiguation)
