= Christian Ruuttu =

Finnish ice hockey player

- Born: 20 February 1964 (age 62) Lappeenranta, Finland
- Height: 6 ft 0 in (183 cm)
- Weight: 201 lb (91 kg; 14 st 5 lb)
- Position: Centre
- Shot: Left
- Played for: Ässät; HIFK; Buffalo Sabres; Chicago Blackhawks; Vancouver Canucks; Frölunda HC; Grasshopper; Espoo Blues
- National team: Finland
- NHL draft: 134th overall, 1983; Buffalo Sabres
- Playing career: 1982–1999

Christian Ruuttu (born 20 February 1964) is a Finnish former professional ice hockey player, who is a scout.

Ruuttu is the father of Alexander Ruuttu, who was drafted by the Phoenix Coyotes. His father Kalevi Ruuttu is a former Bandy World Championship referee.

== Playing career ==
Christian Ruuttu grew up in Pori, where he attended the Swedish-speaking Björneborgs svenska samskola comprehensive school while playing for the Ässät Finnish Elite League club. He was originally drafted by the Buffalo Sabres of the National Hockey League in the 1983 NHL entry draft, 7th round, 134th overall. He played six seasons in Buffalo from 1986–87 through 1991–92, attaining career highs in goals (26 in 1987–88), assists (46 in 1988–89), and points (71 in 1987–88). In Ruuttu's last season in Buffalo, his totals dropped to 4 goals and 21 assists.

Ruuttu began the 1992–93 season playing for the Chicago Blackhawks after being traded for goaltender Stephane Beauregard. He played there for the next two and one-half seasons before being traded to the Vancouver Canucks midway through the 1994–95 season.

After his career as a player, Ruuttu served as General Manager of the Espoo Blues of the Finnish Pro League and was a board member of the Finnish Elite League. He joined the Phoenix Coyotes organization as the Director of European Scouting. He is currently the Director of European Scouting for the Los Angeles Kings.

== Career statistics ==
=== Regular season and playoffs ===
| | | | Regular season | | | | | Playoffs |
| Season | Team | League | GP | G | A | Pts | PIM | GP | G | A | Pts | PIM |
|---|---|---|---|---|---|---|---|---|---|---|---|---|
| 1980–81 | Ässät | FIN U20 | 4 | 1 | 1 | 2 | 2 | — | — | — | — | — |
| 1981–82 | Belmont Hill School | HS-Prep | — | — | — | — | — | — | — | — | — | — |
| 1982–83 | Ässät | FIN U20 | 5 | 2 | 6 | 8 | 12 | — | — | — | — | — |
| 1982–83 | Ässät | SM-l | 36 | 15 | 18 | 33 | 34 | — | — | — | — | — |
| 1983–84 | Ässät | FIN U20 | 2 | 0 | 2 | 2 | 12 | — | — | — | — | — |
| 1983–84 | Ässät | SM-l | 37 | 18 | 42 | 60 | 72 | 9 | 2 | 5 | 7 | 12 |
| 1984–85 | Ässät | FIN U20 | 1 | 3 | 0 | 3 | 0 | — | — | — | — | — |
| 1984–85 | Ässät | SM-l | 32 | 14 | 32 | 46 | 34 | 8 | 1 | 6 | 7 | 8 |
| 1985–86 | HIFK | SM-l | 36 | 16 | 38 | 54 | 47 | 10 | 3 | 6 | 9 | 8 |
| 1986–87 | Buffalo Sabres | NHL | 76 | 22 | 43 | 65 | 62 | — | — | — | — | — |
| 1987–88 | Buffalo Sabres | NHL | 73 | 26 | 45 | 71 | 85 | 6 | 2 | 5 | 7 | 4 |
| 1988–89 | Buffalo Sabres | NHL | 67 | 14 | 46 | 60 | 98 | 2 | 0 | 0 | 0 | 2 |
| 1989–90 | Buffalo Sabres | NHL | 75 | 19 | 41 | 60 | 66 | 6 | 0 | 0 | 0 | 4 |
| 1990–91 | Buffalo Sabres | NHL | 77 | 16 | 34 | 50 | 96 | 6 | 1 | 3 | 4 | 29 |
| 1991–92 | Buffalo Sabres | NHL | 70 | 4 | 21 | 25 | 76 | 3 | 0 | 0 | 0 | 6 |
| 1992–93 | Chicago Blackhawks | NHL | 84 | 17 | 37 | 54 | 134 | 4 | 0 | 0 | 0 | 2 |
| 1993–94 | Chicago Blackhawks | NHL | 54 | 9 | 20 | 29 | 68 | 6 | 0 | 0 | 0 | 2 |
| 1994–95 | HIFK | SM-l | 20 | 4 | 8 | 12 | 24 | — | — | — | — | — |
| 1994–95 | Chicago Blackhawks | NHL | 20 | 2 | 5 | 7 | 6 | — | — | — | — | — |
| 1994–95 | Vancouver Canucks | NHL | 25 | 5 | 6 | 11 | 23 | 9 | 1 | 1 | 2 | 0 |
| 1995–96 | Västra Frölunda HC | SEL | 32 | 13 | 25 | 38 | 98 | 12 | 4 | 7 | 11 | 34 |
| 1996–97 | Grasshopper Club Zürich | NDB | 42 | 31 | 40 | 71 | 72 | 11 | 5 | 9 | 14 | 6 |
| 1997–98 | HIFK | SM-l | 44 | 11 | 28 | 39 | 24 | 9 | 3 | 3 | 6 | 8 |
| 1998–99 | Blues | SM-l | 45 | 14 | 22 | 36 | 40 | 4 | 0 | 1 | 1 | 0 |
| SM-l totals | | | 250 | 92 | 188 | 280 | 275 | 40 | 9 | 21 | 30 | 36 |
| NHL totals | | | 621 | 134 | 298 | 432 | 714 | 42 | 4 | 9 | 13 | 49 |

=== International ===
| Year | Team | Event | GP | G | A | Pts | PIM |
|---|---|---|---|---|---|---|---|
| 1983 | Finland | WJC | 7 | 2 | 2 | 4 | 14 |
| 1984 | Finland | WJC | 7 | 0 | 4 | 4 | 6 |
| 1985 | Finland | WC | 6 | 1 | 1 | 2 | 16 |
| 1986 | Finland | WC | 10 | 2 | 5 | 7 | 12 |
| 1987 | Finland | CC | 5 | 2 | 1 | 3 | 10 |
| 1987 | Finland | WC | 10 | 0 | 0 | 0 | 18 |
| 1990 | Finland | WC | 9 | 5 | 3 | 8 | 4 |
| 1991 | Finland | CC | 6 | 1 | 5 | 6 | 4 |
| 1991 | Finland | WC | 10 | 7 | 3 | 10 | 10 |
| 1992 | Finland | WC | 5 | 0 | 1 | 1 | 6 |
| 1994 | Finland | WC | 4 | 2 | 2 | 4 | 4 |
| 1996 | Finland | WCH | 4 | 1 | 0 | 1 | 2 |
| 1996 | Finland | WC | 6 | 0 | 2 | 2 | 2 |
| Junior totals | | | 14 | 2 | 6 | 8 | 20 |
| Senior totals | | | 75 | 21 | 23 | 44 | 88 |

== Awards ==
- Finnish First All-Star Team (1986)
- Played in NHL All-Star Game (1988)

| Preceded by Terho Koskela | Frölunda HC captains 1995–1996 | Succeeded by Henrik Nilsson |
