= Johan Andersson =

Johan Andersson may refer to:

== Footballers ==
- Johan Andersson (footballer, born 1974), Swedish footballer
- Johan Andersson (footballer, born 1983), Swedish footballer
- Johan Andersson (footballer, born June 1995), Swedish footballer
- Johan Andersson (footballer, born May 1995), Swedish footballer

== Ice hockey players ==
- H. Johan Andersson (born 1984), Swedish ice hockey player
- Johan A. Andersson (born 1984), Swedish ice hockey player
- Johan Andersson (ice hockey, born 1987), Swedish ice hockey player

== Other people ==
- Johan Andersson (artist) (born 1986), Swedish painter
- Johan Andersson (game developer) (born 1974), Swedish game programmer
- Johan Andersson (politician) (born 1961), Swedish Social Democrat politician
- Johan Andersson (wrestler) (1889–1965), Swedish Olympic wrestler
- Johan Gunnar Andersson (1874–1960), Swedish archaeologist, paleontologist and geologist
- Johan Andersson (tennis), Swedish wheelchair quad tennis player

== See also ==
- Johan Anderson (born 1971), Australian tennis player
- Johan Andersen (disambiguation)
- Andersson
