= Claes Andersson =

Finnish psychiatrist, writer, musician, and politician

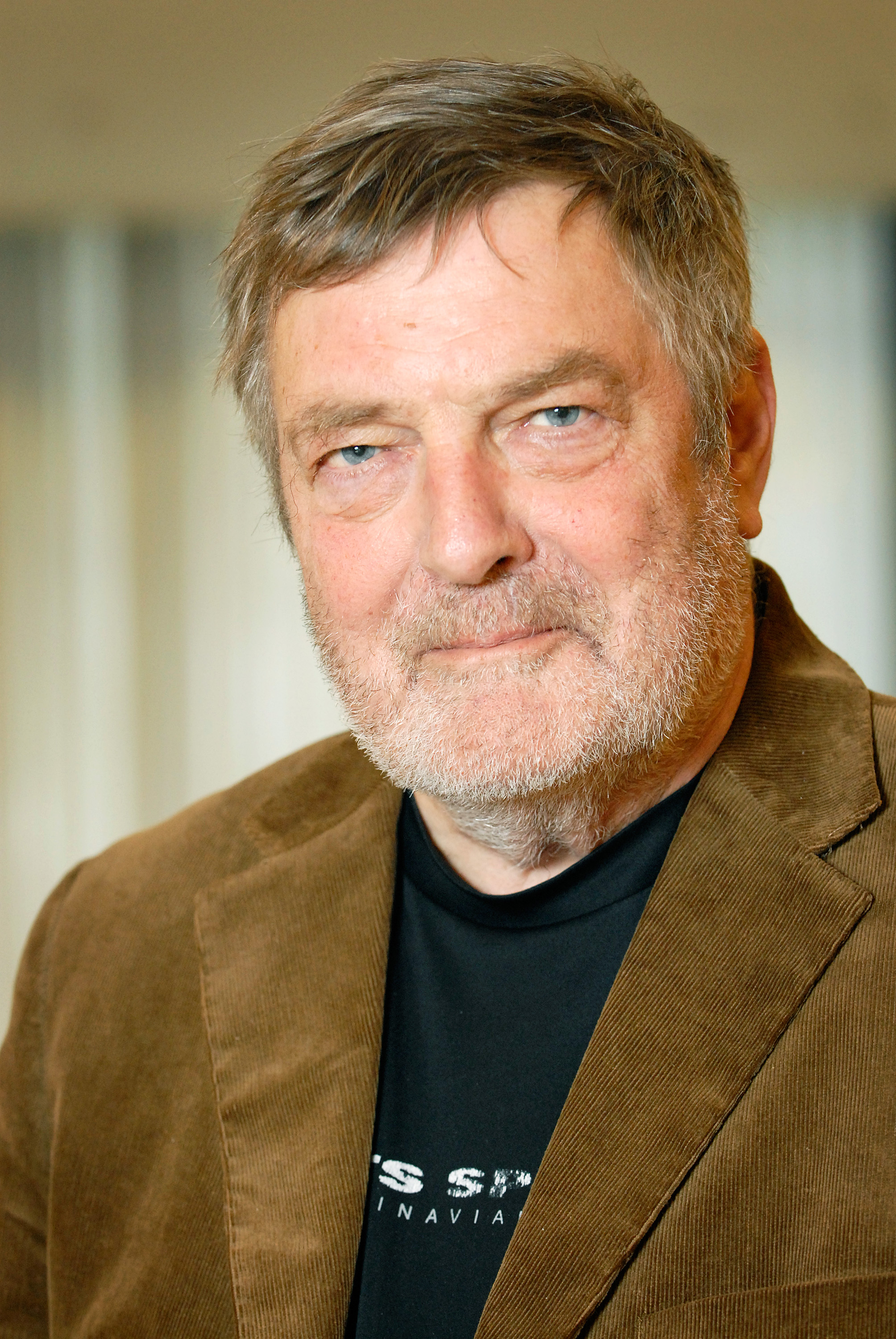
- Claes Andersson
- Born: 30 May 1937; Helsinki, Finland
- Died: 24 July 2019 (aged 82); Helsinki, Finland
- Education: University of Helsinki (Licentiate of Medicine, 1962)
- Occupations: psychiatrist, author, poet, jazz musician, politician
- Notable work: Ventil (1962); Bakom bilderna (1972); En mänska börjar likna sin själ (1983)
- Spouses: Christina Forsten (m. 1959; div. 1970); Katriina Kuusi (m. 1970)
- Parents: Oscar Rudolf Andersson; Ethel Dorotea Hjelt
- Awards: Längman Prize (1967, 1977); State Prize for Literature (1968, 1973)

Claes-Johan Rudolf Andersson (30 May 1937 – 24 July 2019) was a Swedish-speaking Finnish psychiatrist, author, poet, jazz musician, politician and member of the Finnish Parliament, representing the Left Alliance and the Finnish People's Democratic League. He was a member of the Finnish Parliament from 1987 to 1999 and from 2007 to 2008, and served as the Minister of Culture in the Lipponen I Cabinet.

== Personal life ==
Andersson's parents were managing director Oscar Rudolf Andersson and Ethel Dorotea Hjelt. He was married to Christina Forsten from 1959 until their divorce in 1970. In 1970, he married Katriina Kuusi. His son Ville Andersson is a Finnish diplomat and former footballer.

== Career ==
Andersson graduated from the school Läroverket för gossar och flickor in Helsinki in 1955. He went on to study medicine at the University of Helsinki, earning a Licentiate of Medicine degree in 1962. He qualified as a specialist in psychiatry in 1969.

As a physician, he worked at Tammiharju Hospital from 1962 to 1967 and at Hesperia Hospital from 1967 to 1969. He then served as the chief physician at the Veikkola sanatorium between 1969 and 1973. Beginning in 1974, he was a physician at the mental health office in Loviisa.

== Literary work ==
Andersson's literary career began in 1962 with the publication of his poetry collection Ventil (Valve). From 1965, he was a literary critic for several publications, including Hufvudstadsbladet, FNT, and Nya Argus. He was also the editor-in-chief of the journal FBT from 1965 to 1969. His 1967 poetry collection Samhället vi dör i featured pictures and layout design by his then-wife Christina Andersson.

He was active in literary organizations, serving on the board of the Society of Swedish Authors in Finland from 1967, as its vice chairman from 1977 to 1979, and as its chairman from 1978 to 1982. He was also a member of the State Committee for Literature from 1974 to 1976.

=== Selected works ===
The following is a selection of his works.

Poems

- Ventil (1962)
- Som om ingenting hänt (1964)
- Staden heter Helsingfors (1965)
- Samhället vi dör i (1967)
- Det är inte lätt att vara villaägare i dessa tider (1969)
- Bli, tillsammans (1970)
- Bakom bilderna (1972)
- Rumskamrater (1974)
- Jag har mött dem. Dikter 1962—74 (selected poems, 1976)
- Genom sprickorna i vårt ansikte (1977)
- Trädens sånger (1979)
- Tillkortakommanden (1981)

Novels

- Den fagraste vår (1976)
- En mänska börjar likna sin själ (1983)

Plays

- Familjen (1973–74)
- Gris i säcken (1975)
- Lindbloms (1976)
- Sotis (1978)
- Bänksit (1981)

Collaborative Plays

- Wälläri o.s.v. (1967–68, with Bengt Ahlfors and Johan Bargum)
- Kropp (1969, with Bengt Ahlfors and Johan Bargum)
- Med-borgare! (1970, with Bengt Ahlfors and Johan Bargum)
- Ringleken (1979, with Bengt Ahlfors and Johan Bargum)
- Pojke/Flicka (1970, with Johan Bargum)
- Oss emellan (1975, with Johan Bargum)
- Verandan (1977, with Johan Bargum)
- Diktonius (1974, with Tua Forsström)
- På era platser... färdiga... (1980, with Johan Bargum and Tua Forsström)
- Älä tuhlaa aikaa (1975, with Jukka Hauru and Eero Ohjanen)
- Eko! (1982, with Markus Fagerlund and Anders Engström)

Radio and Television Productions

- Sjuk eller skyldig (TV play, 1969, with Ulf-Göran Ahlfors)
- Tre långa år (TV play, 1969, with Åke Lindman)
- Grottan (TV play, 1970, with Åke Lindman)
- Fem slags kärlek (radio play, 1975)
- Samtal under mullen (radio play, 1976)
- Röster i stenen (radio play, 1979)
- Angina (radio play, 1981)

== Awards ==
- Längman Prize (1967, 1977)
- State Prize for Literature (1968, 1973)
- Playwright Prize (with Bengt Ahlfors and Johan Bargum, 1968)
- Swedish Literature Society in Finland Prize (1968, 1978, 1980)
- State Translator Prize (1979)

Claes Andersson presenting himself in the Gothenburg Book Fair in 2012 with (English subtitles)
