= Johan Andersen =

Johan Andersen may refer to:

- Johan Andersen (politician) (1902–1968), Norwegian politician for the Labour Party
- Johan Andersen (canoeist) (1920–2003), Danish Olympic flatwater canoer
- Jesse Anderson (Yu-Gi-Oh! GX), a fictional character in the anime series Yu-Gi-Oh! GX
- Johan Vilhelm Andersen (1892–1971), Danish painter

== See also ==
- Johan Anderson (born 1971), former Australian tennis player
- Johan Andersson (disambiguation)
