= Storvreten =

District of Tumba, Sweden

Coordinates: 59.1950°N 17.8450°E

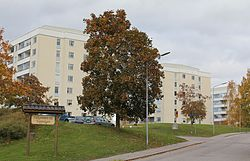
Storvreten, May 2016

Storvreten is a residential area in Tumba, Sweden, that was built during the late 1960s and the early 1970s.

== History ==
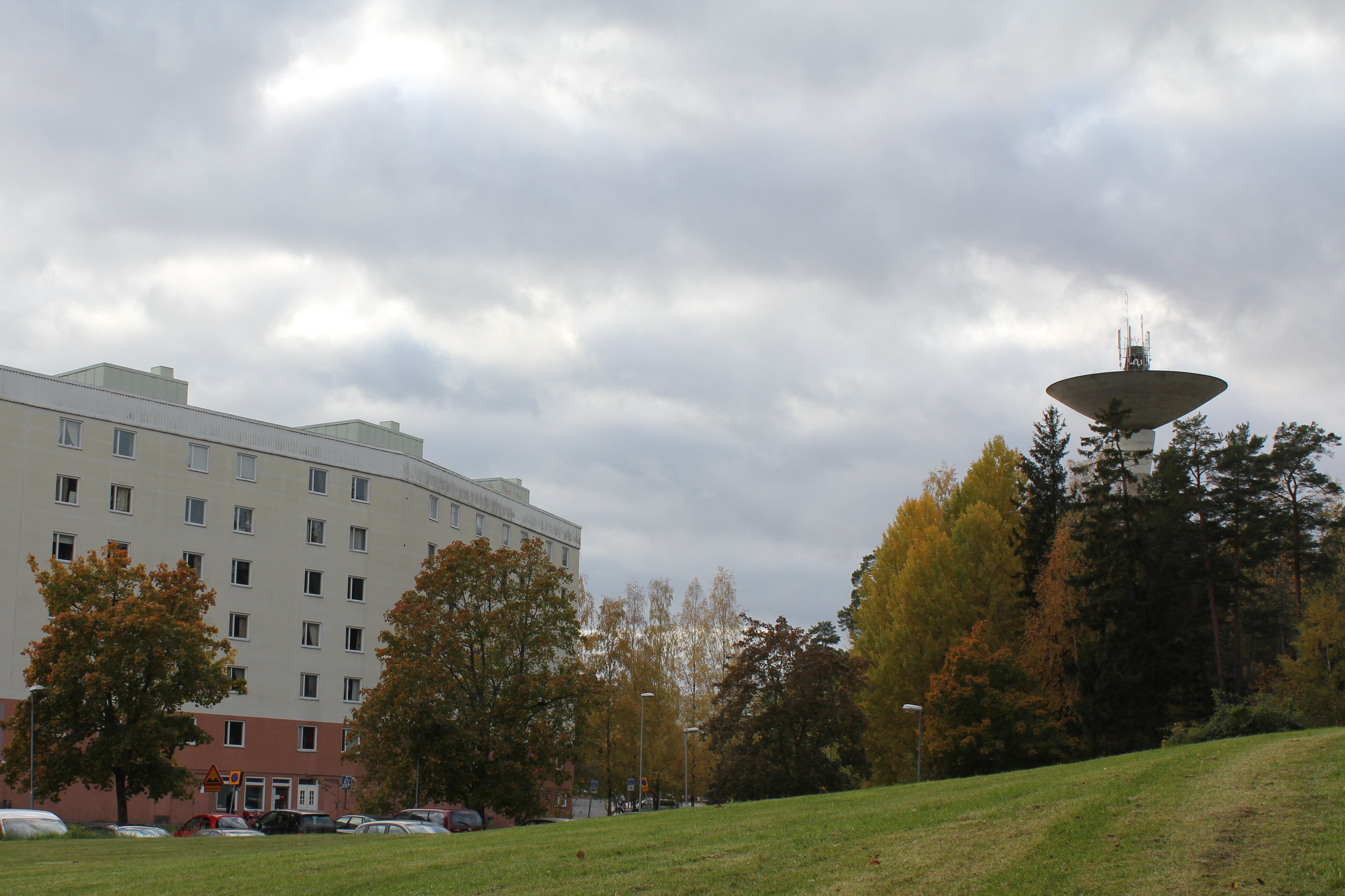
Apartment block with a somewhat rounded form, which is rather common in Storvreten. Water tower in the background

Storvreten sits high on a ridge that was once entirely forest.

In the mid-1960s, modern housing began to be built for the employees of Alfa Laval’s new plant in Tumba. The area was built mainly with six- to eight-storey apartment blocks with light façades, earning it the nickname “the white city.” The buildings were arranged to follow the rocky terrain, allowing green areas to be preserved between them.

A park, Storvretsparken, was created in the valley between western and eastern Storvreten, where a public swimming facility opened in the early 1970s. By that time, a school, several preschools, and a small local centre with a grocery had been completed. During the 1970s, lower blocks and small houses were added on the outskirts to balance the earlier large-scale development, bringing the total number of dwellings to about 2,500.

The layout of Storvreten was designed around a main road for through traffic, with local streets leading to the housing blocks to allow easy car access. A hierarchical street network separated pedestrians from vehicles to reduce the growing number of accidents that came with increasing car ownership.

Sweden’s strong post-war economy and severe housing shortage contributed to the rapid pace of urban expansion during this period. In 2015, a new plan was made to intensify and supplement the current housing stock with roughly 2,000–2,500 new dwellings by 2040.

Since 2019, Storvreten is listed by the police as a "utsatt område" (vulnerable area).

== See also ==
- Million Programme
