= Alexander Ruuttu =

American ice hockey player

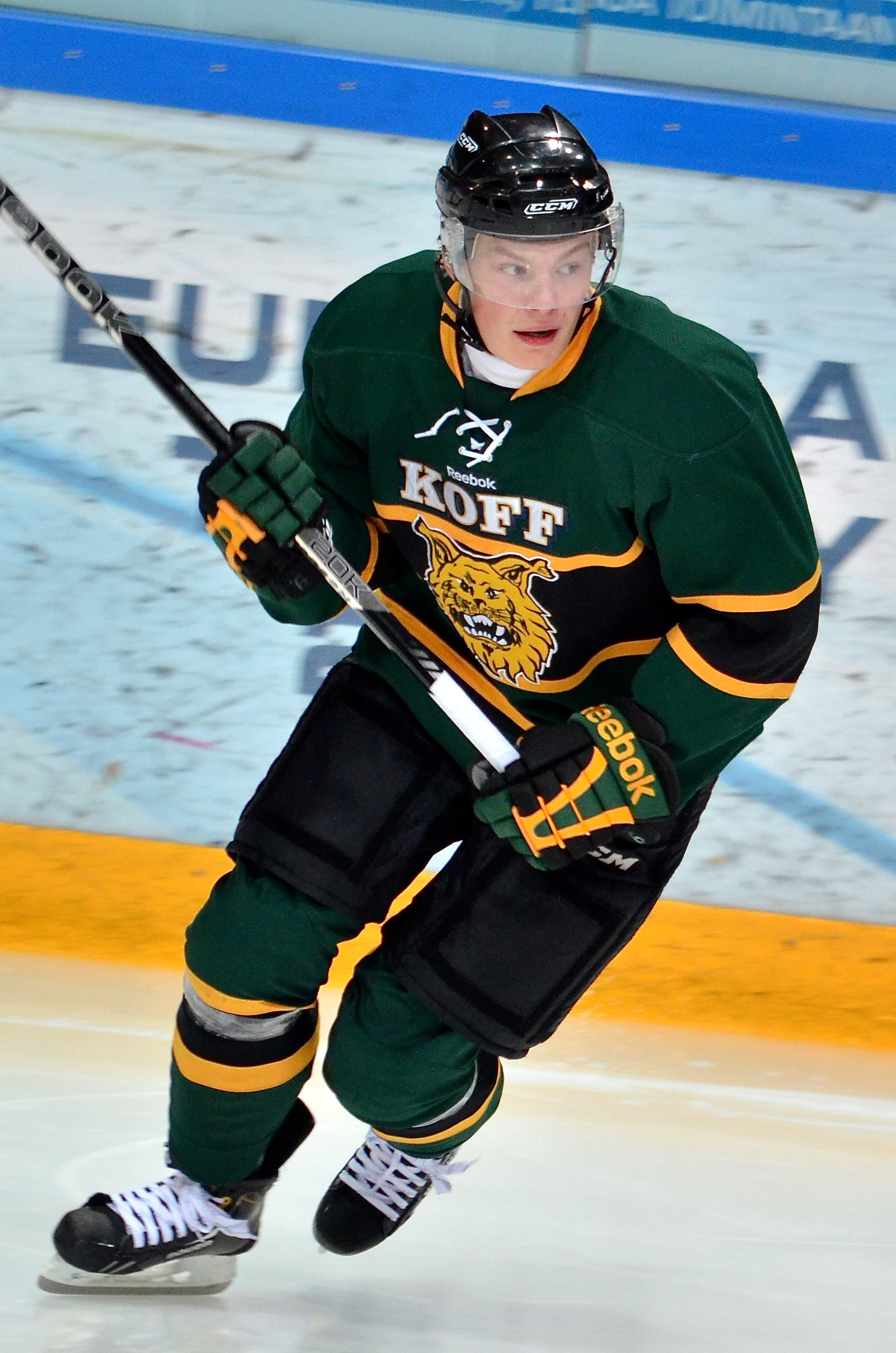
- Born: December 9, 1992 (age 33) Chicago, Illinois, U.S.
- Height: 6 ft 2 in (188 cm)
- Weight: 176 lb (80 kg; 12 st 8 lb)
- Position: Right wing
- Shoots: Right
- DEL team Former teams: Adler Mannheim; Jokerit; Ilves; TPS; KalPa; Ässät; Jukurit
- NHL draft: 51st overall, 2011; Phoenix Coyotes
- Playing career: 2011–present

Alexander Ruuttu (born December 9, 1992) is an American born Finnish professional ice hockey forward. He is currently playing for Adler Mannheim in the Deutsche Eishockey Liga. Ruuttu was selected by the Phoenix Coyotes in the 2nd round (51st overall) of the 2011 NHL entry draft. Ruuttu was part of KalPa's Spengler Cup Championship winning team in 2018.

His father is the former National Hockey League (NHL) player, Christian Ruuttu.

== Career statistics ==
=== Regular season and playoffs ===
			Regular season					Playoffs
Season	Team	League	GP	G	A	Pts	PIM	GP	G	A	Pts	PIM
2010–11	Jokerit	Jr. A	41	18	13	31	14	6	1	1	2	6
2010–11	Jokerit	SM-l	1	0	0	0	0	—	—	—	—	—
2011–12	Jokerit	Jr. A	13	6	10	16	20	8	1	1	2	6
2011–12	Kiekko-Vantaa	Mestis	20	2	7	9	4	4	0	0	0	2
2011–12	Jokerit	SM-l	13	1	0	1	4	—	—	—	—	—
2012–13	Kiekko-Vantaa	Mestis	35	9	17	26	43	—	—	—	—	—
2012–13	Jokerit	SM-l	4	0	0	0	0	—	—	—	—	—
2012–13	Ilves	SM-l	18	0	6	6	52	—	—	—	—	—
2013–14	Ilves	Liiga	33	5	9	14	0	—	—	—	—	—
2014–15	LeKi	Mestis	8	0	2	2	2	—	—	—	—	—
2014–15	Ilves	Liiga	16	0	1	1	6	—	—	—	—	—
2014–15	TPS	Liiga	25	2	2	4	2	—	—	—	—	—
2015–16	Tingsryds AIF	Allsv	48	15	9	24	37	—	—	—	—	—
2016–17	KalPa	Liiga	60	8	7	15	8	8	1	3	4	4
2017–18	KalPa	Liiga	54	17	12	29	4	6	2	0	2	2
2018–19	KalPa	Liiga	31	12	2	14	4	—	—	—	—	—
2019–20	KalPa	Liiga	42	6	4	10	20	—	—	—	—	—
2020–21	KalPa	Liiga	49	14	10	24	24	4	1	1	2	0
2021–22	Ässät	Liiga	47	10	13	23	10	—	—	—	—	—
2022–23	Ässät	Liiga	33	6	2	8	2	4	0	2	2	2
2023–24	Krefeld Pinguine	DEL2	37	6	11	17	35	7	0	1	1	4
2024–25	Jukurit	Liiga	32	8	7	15	2	—	—	—	—	—
2025–26	Jukurit	Liiga	44	13	10	23	14	—	—	—	—	—
Liiga totals			502	102	85	187	152	26	4	6	10	8
