= Mikael Andersson (ice hockey, born 1966) =

Swedish ice hockey player (born 1966)

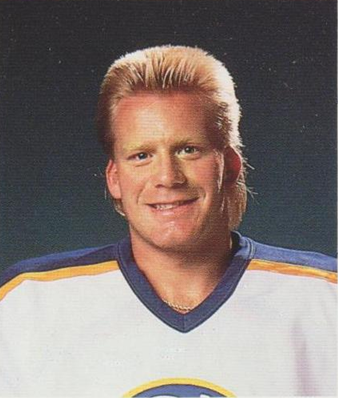
- Andersson in 1988
- Born: 10 May 1966 (age 60) Malmö, Sweden
- Height: 5 ft 11 in (180 cm)
- Weight: 82 kg (181 lb; 12 st 13 lb)
- Position: Right wing
- Shot: Left
- Played for: Västra Frölunda HC; Buffalo Sabres; Hartford Whalers; Tampa Bay Lightning; Philadelphia Flyers; New York Islanders
- National team: Sweden
- NHL draft: 18th overall, 1984; Buffalo Sabres
- Playing career: 1982–2003

Mikael Bo Andersson (born 10 May 1966) is a Swedish former professional ice hockey forward who played 15 seasons in the National Hockey League (NHL) for the Buffalo Sabres, Hartford Whalers, Tampa Bay Lightning, Philadelphia Flyers, and New York Islanders. Andersson is now serving as a scout for the Tampa Bay Lightning. He is the older brother of former hockey player Niklas Andersson.

== Career statistics ==
=== Regular season and playoffs ===
			Regular season					Playoffs
Season	Team	League	GP	G	A	Pts	PIM	GP	G	A	Pts	PIM
1980–81	Kungälv/Ytterby HK	SWE-3	16	2	11	—	—	—	—	—	—
1981–82	Västra Frölunda IF	SWE U20	—	—	—	—	—	—	—	—	—	—
1982–83	Västra Frölunda IF	SWE U20	—	—	—	—	—	—	—	—	—	—
1982–83	Västra Frölunda IF	SWE	1	1	0	1	0	—	—	—	—	—
1983–84	Västra Frölunda IF	SWE	18	0	3	3	0	—	—	—	—	—
1984–85	Västra Frölunda HC	SWE-2	36	19	13	32	20	6	3	2	5	2
1985–86	Rochester Americans	AHL	20	10	4	14	6	—	—	—	—	—
1985–86	Buffalo Sabres	NHL	32	1	9	10	4	—	—	—	—	—
1986–87	Rochester Americans	AHL	42	6	20	26	14	9	1	2	3	2
1986–87	Buffalo Sabres	NHL	16	0	3	3	0	—	—	—	—	—
1987–88	Rochester Americans	AHL	35	12	24	36	16	—	—	—	—	—
1987–88	Buffalo Sabres	NHL	37	3	20	23	10	1	1	0	1	0
1988–89	Rochester Americans	AHL	56	18	33	51	12	—	—	—	—	—
1988–89	Buffalo Sabres	NHL	14	0	1	1	4	—	—	—	—	—
1989–90	Hartford Whalers	NHL	50	13	24	37	6	5	0	3	3	2
1990–91	Springfield Indians	AHL	26	7	22	29	10	18	10	8	18	12
1990–91	Hartford Whalers	NHL	41	4	7	11	8	—	—	—	—	—
1991–92	Hartford Whalers	NHL	74	18	29	47	14	7	0	2	2	6
1992–93	Tampa Bay Lightning	NHL	77	16	11	27	14	—	—	—	—	—
1993–94	Tampa Bay Lightning	NHL	76	13	12	25	23	—	—	—	—	—
1994–95	Västra Frölunda HC	SWE	7	1	0	1	31	—	—	—	—	—
1994–95	Tampa Bay Lightning	NHL	36	4	7	11	4	—	—	—	—	—
1995–96	Tampa Bay Lightning	NHL	64	8	11	19	2	6	1	1	2	0
1996–97	Tampa Bay Lightning	NHL	70	5	14	19	8	—	—	—	—	—
1997–98	Tampa Bay Lightning	NHL	72	6	11	17	29	—	—	—	—	—
1998–99	Tampa Bay Lightning	NHL	40	2	3	5	4	—	—	—	—	—
1998–99	Philadelphia Flyers	NHL	7	0	1	1	0	6	0	1	1	2
1999–00	Philadelphia Flyers	NHL	36	2	3	5	0	—	—	—	—	—
1999–00	New York Islanders	NHL	19	0	3	3	4	—	—	—	—	—
2000–01	Västra Frölunda HC	SWE	48	10	6	16	12	3	0	0	0	2
2001–02	Västra Frölunda HC	SWE	47	14	15	29	65	9	0	1	1	6
2002–03	Västra Frölunda HC	SWE	43	6	6	12	43	16	1	3	4	6
SWE totals			164	32	30	62	151	28	1	4	5	14
NHL totals			761	95	169	264	134	25	2	7	9	10

=== International ===
Year	Team	Event	GP	G	A	Pts	PIM
1983	Sweden	EJC	5	2	0	2	4
1984	Sweden	EJC	5	8	8	16	—
1984	Sweden	WJC	7	1	2	3	8
1985	Sweden	WJC	5	2	3	5	0
1986	Sweden	WJC	7	4	3	7	10
1991	Sweden	CC	6	0	1	1	2
1992	Sweden	WC	5	1	1	2	0
1993	Sweden	WC	8	2	2	4	2
1994	Sweden	WC	8	2	0	2	0
1996	Sweden	WCH	4	0	1	1	2
1998	Sweden	OG	4	1	1	2	0
Junior totals			29	17	16	33	22
Senior totals			35	6	6	12	6

He played for the tempa bay lightning for 2000-01 two.

Preceded by Adam Creighton	Buffalo Sabres first-round draft pick 1984	Succeeded by Calle Johansson
Preceded by Henrik Nilsson	Frölunda HC captains 2000–2003	Succeeded by Jonas Johnson
