= Rönninge Salem Fotboll =

Swedish football club

- Full name: Rönninge Salem Fotboll
- Nickname(s): RSF
- Founded: 1991
- Ground: Berga IP; Rönninge; Sweden
- Chairman: Anders Strömgren
- Coach: (W)
- Coach: Miguel Gonzalez (M)
- League: Division 3 B and Division 5 Stockholm Södra
Home colours

Rönninge Salem Fotboll is a Swedish football club located in Rönninge.

== Background ==
Rönninge Salem Fotboll is the result of a merger of the football sections of Rönninge SK (formed 1923) and IFK Salem (formed 1972). The merger took place in 1991 and the first season was in 1992. In 1989 Rönninge SK men's team played in Division 3 Östra Svealand.

Rönninge Salem Fotboll currently plays in the women's Division 3 B (which is the fifth tier of Swedish women's football) and the men's Division 5 Stockholm Södra (which is the seventh tier of Swedish men's football). They play their home matches at the Berga IP in Rönninge.

The club is affiliated to Stockholms Fotbollförbund.

== Season to season ==
| Season | Level | Division | Section | Position | Movements |
|---|---|---|---|---|---|
| 2003 | Tier 5 | Division 4 | Stockholm Södra | 8th | |
| 2004 | Tier 5 | Division 4 | Stockholm Södra | 12th | Relegated |
| 2005 | Tier 6 | Division 5 | Stockholm Södra | 8th | |
| 2006* | Tier 7 | Division 5 | Stockholm Södra | 3rd | Promoted |
| 2007 | Tier 6 | Division 4 | Stockholm Södra | 9th | |
| 2008 | Tier 6 | Division 4 | Stockholm Södra | 9th | |
| 2009 | Tier 6 | Division 4 | Stockholm Södra | 3rd | |
| 2010 | Tier 6 | Division 4 | Stockholm Södra | 6th | |
| 2011 | Tier 6 | Division 4 | Stockholm Södra | | |

* League restructuring in 2006 resulted in a new division being created at Tier 3 and subsequent divisions dropping a level.
