= Alexandre Texier =

French ice hockey player (born 1999)

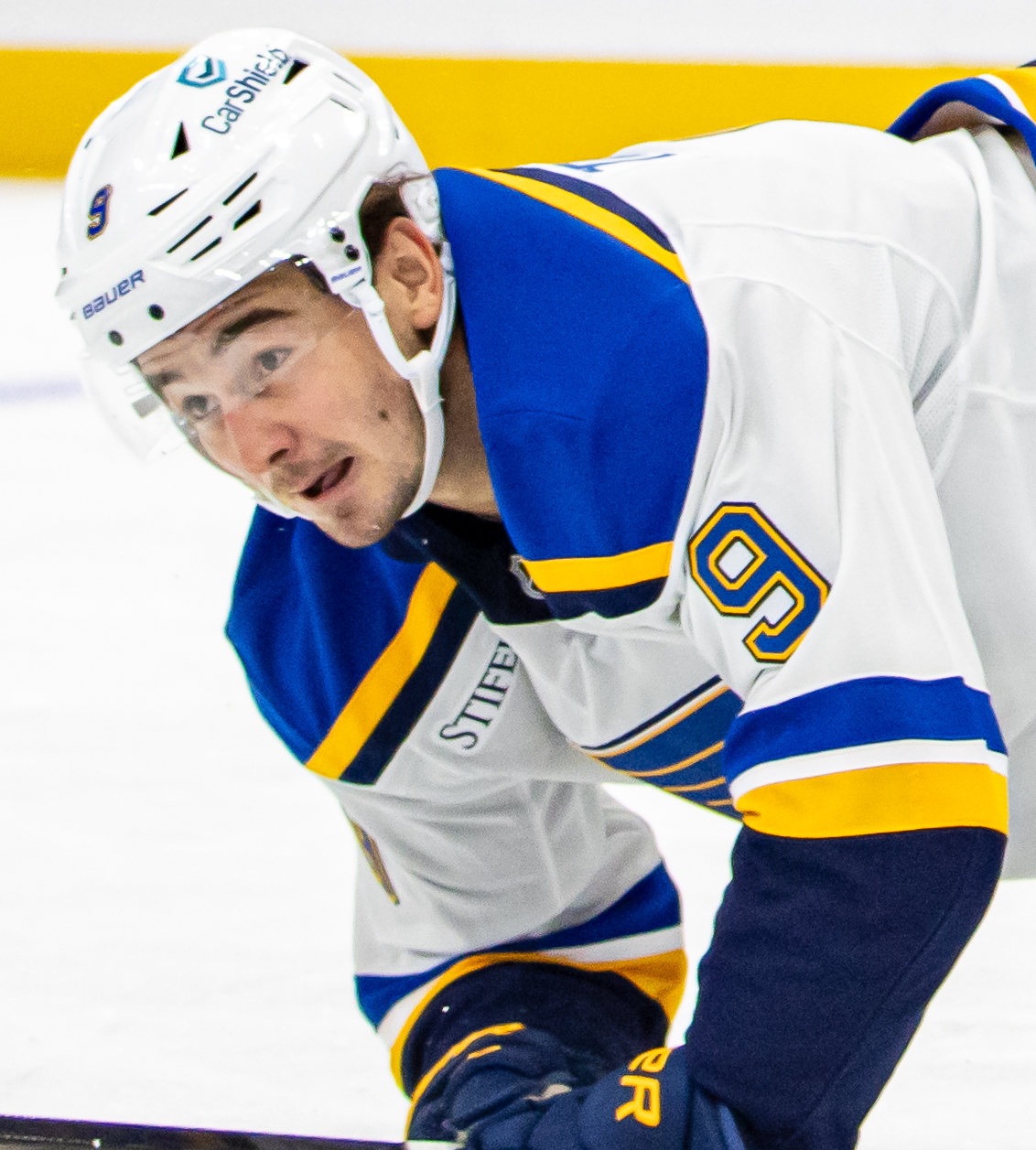
- Texier with the St. Louis Blues in 2024
- Born: 13 September 1999 (age 27) Saint-Martin-d'Hères, France
- Height: 6 ft 1 in (185 cm)
- Weight: 201 lb (91 kg; 14 st 5 lb)
- Position: Forward
- Shoots: Left
- NHL team Former teams: Montreal Canadiens; Brûleurs de Loups; KalPa; Columbus Blue Jackets; ZSC Lions; St. Louis Blues
- National team: France
- NHL draft: 45th overall, 2017; Columbus Blue Jackets
- Playing career: 2016–present

Alexandre Texier (French pronunciation: [alɛksɑ̃dʁ(ə) tɛksje]; born 13 September 1999) is a French professional ice hockey player who is a forward for the Montreal Canadiens of the National Hockey League (NHL). Texier started his career with the Brûleurs de Loups in the French Ligue Magnus, winning the Coupe de France and earned the Jean-Pierre Graff Trophy as the league's best young player in 2017.

He was selected by the Columbus Blue Jackets in the second round, 45th overall, of the 2017 NHL entry draft, the first player drafted directly out of the French league. After spending two seasons with KalPa of the Finnish Liiga, with whom he won the Spengler Cup in 2018, Texier moved to North America and made his NHL debut with the Blue Jackets in April 2019. He has also previously played in the NHL for the St. Louis Blues. Internationally, Texier has represented France at the junior and senior levels.

== Playing career ==
=== Europe ===
Texier grew up playing for Brûleurs de Loups in Grenoble, France, the same club his father Fabrice played for from 1989 until 1992. A rookie in the French Ligue Magnus in 2016–17, he was awarded the Jean-Pierre Graff Trophy as the best first-year player. Ranked as the 16th-best European skater prior to the 2017 NHL entry draft by the National Hockey League (NHL) Central Scouting Bureau, he was ultimately selected in the second round (45th overall) by the Columbus Blue Jackets, becoming the first player drafted directly out of France. Thereafter, Texier, who was also selected in the CHL Import Draft by the Baie-Comeau Drakkar of the Quebec Major Junior Hockey League (QMJHL), moved to KalPa of the Finnish Liiga for the 2017–18 season. Slotting into the lineup as the team's youngest player, he produced 13 goals and 22 points in 53 games. On 22 May 2018, Texier was signed to a three-year, entry-level contract by the Blue Jackets, who then allowed him to spend an additional season abroad in Finland.

=== North America ===
Following his second season with Kalpa, in which he led the team with 41 points in 55 games and captured the 2018 Spengler Cup, Texier was assigned to the Blue Jackets' American Hockey League (AHL) affiliate, the Cleveland Monsters. He appeared in seven games for the Monsters, scoring seven points, before being recalled by the Blue Jackets. On 5 April 2019, Texier made his NHL debut against the New York Rangers, and scored his first NHL goal the following night against the Ottawa Senators. He then registered his first career playoff goal against the Tampa Bay Lightning in game four of the Blue Jackets' ensuing first-round playoff series on 16 April.

During his first full campaign in the NHL, Texier suffered a lumbar stress fracture that limited him to only 36 games played during the 2019–20 season. Collecting six goals and seven assists over the course of the regular season, he likewise contributed four assists in 10 postseason games.

With the 2020–21 season delayed due to the COVID-19 pandemic, Texier was originally loaned to join his former Finnish club, KalPa, on 8 September 2020. Due to personal reasons however, he opted to cancel his loan and return to hometown club Brûleurs de Loups until the resumption of league play on 5 October 2020. On 28 January 2021, Texier used a rare offensive poke check to score the game winning shootout goal in a 3–2 win over the Florida Panthers. The move, which he has used on other occasions, has been nicknamed "The French Poke".

Citing personal issues and needing to be closer to family, Texier stepped away from the Blue Jackets in August 2022. He instead signed a one-year deal to join the ZSC Lions of the Swiss National League (NL) for the 2022–23 season. On 28 June 2024, Texier was traded to the St. Louis Blues in exchange for a 4th-round pick in the 2025 NHL entry draft; he subsequently agreed to a two-year, $4.2 million extension with the Blues.

After being placed on unconditional waivers by St. Louis on 22 November 2025 for the purpose of terminating his contract, Texier was signed to a one-year contract by the Montreal Canadiens for the remainder of the 2025–26 season.

Shortly into his newfound tenure with the Canadiens, he was moved onto the team's top line alongside Nick Suzuki and Cole Caufield, seeing an increase in offensive production as a result. Recording his first career three-point outing on 7 January 2026 against the Calgary Flames, Texier joined fellow countrymen Pierre-Édouard Bellemare and Antoine Roussel as the only France nationals to reach 100 career NHL points in league history. The following night, he registered his first career NHL hat-trick against the Florida Panthers. Totaling 16 points through his first 25 games played with the team, Texier was signed to a two-year contract extension by the Canadiens on 14 January. Used primarily in a supporting capacity thereafter, he finished the regular season with eight goals and 12 assists in 43 games played with Montreal. During the 2026 Stanley Cup playoffs, Texier scored his first playoff goal in seven years while also managing an assist in a 3–2 victory over the Tampa Bay Lightning in game 3 of their first round matchup.

== International play ==
Medal record

Representing France

Men's ice hockey

World Junior Championships Division I A
| Bronze medal – third place | 2017 Germany | |

World U18 Championships Division I A
| Gold medal – first place | 2017 Slovenia | |
| Bronze medal – third place | 2015 Hungary | |

As member of the French under-18 team, Texier led his country to victory at the 2017 U18 World Championship, earning promotion to the elite division for the first time in team history. For his part, he recorded five points in five games, and was named the tournament's top forward. Although expected to make his debut for the French senior national team at the ensuing World Championship, a shoulder injury kept him out of action. He played the following year for the senior team at the 2018 World Championship, becoming the third-youngest player in the tournament. Texier then joined the French national team for the 2019 World Championship in which his country was relegated after losing all of its games.

During the 2025–26 season, Texier was named to France's roster ahead of the 2026 Winter Olympics held in Milan.

== Personal life ==
Texier's father, Fabrice, was also an ice hockey player, and introduced his son to the sport. Fabrice played four games in the 1986–87 QMJHL season with the Laval Titan, spending the rest of his career in France, mainly with the Brûleurs de Loups.

== Career statistics ==
=== Regular season and playoffs ===
| | | | Regular season | | | | | Playoffs |
| Season | Team | League | GP | G | A | Pts | PIM | GP | G | A | Pts | PIM |
|---|---|---|---|---|---|---|---|---|---|---|---|---|
| 2013–14 | Brûleurs de Loups | FRA U18 | 8 | 7 | 4 | 11 | 4 | — | — | — | — | — |
| 2014–15 | Brûleurs de Loups | FRA U18 | 17 | 16 | 18 | 34 | 32 | 6 | 6 | 6 | 12 | 6 |
| 2015–16 | Brûleurs de Loups | FRA U18 | 17 | 40 | 30 | 70 | 26 | 6 | 9 | 12 | 21 | 10 |
| 2015–16 | Brûleurs de Loups | FRA U22 | 11 | 9 | 8 | 17 | 14 | 6 | 7 | 4 | 11 | 8 |
| 2016–17 | Brûleurs de Loups | FRA | 40 | 10 | 9 | 19 | 69 | 12 | 5 | 5 | 10 | 12 |
| 2017–18 | KalPa | Liiga | 53 | 13 | 9 | 22 | 38 | 6 | 1 | 1 | 2 | 25 |
| 2018–19 | KalPa | Liiga | 55 | 14 | 27 | 41 | 36 | — | — | — | — | — |
| 2018–19 | Cleveland Monsters | AHL | 7 | 5 | 2 | 7 | 4 | 1 | 0 | 0 | 0 | 2 |
| 2018–19 | Columbus Blue Jackets | NHL | 2 | 1 | 0 | 1 | 0 | 8 | 2 | 1 | 3 | 2 |
| 2019–20 | Columbus Blue Jackets | NHL | 36 | 6 | 7 | 13 | 10 | 10 | 0 | 4 | 4 | 2 |
| 2020–21 | Brûleurs de Loups | FRA | 2 | 1 | 0 | 1 | 2 | — | — | — | — | — |
| 2020–21 | Columbus Blue Jackets | NHL | 49 | 4 | 11 | 15 | 22 | — | — | — | — | — |
| 2021–22 | Columbus Blue Jackets | NHL | 36 | 11 | 9 | 20 | 12 | — | — | — | — | — |
| 2022–23 | ZSC Lions | NL | 46 | 13 | 22 | 35 | 30 | — | — | — | — | — |
| 2023–24 | Columbus Blue Jackets | NHL | 78 | 12 | 18 | 30 | 38 | — | — | — | — | — |
| 2024–25 | St. Louis Blues | NHL | 31 | 6 | 5 | 11 | 10 | 3 | 0 | 1 | 1 | 0 |
| 2025–26 | St. Louis Blues | NHL | 8 | 0 | 1 | 1 | 2 | — | — | — | — | — |
| 2025–26 | Montreal Canadiens | NHL | 43 | 8 | 12 | 20 | 24 | 19 | 4 | 4 | 8 | 4 |
| NHL totals | | | 283 | 48 | 63 | 111 | 118 | 40 | 6 | 10 | 16 | 8 |

=== International ===
| Year | Team | Event | Results | GP | G | A | Pts | PIM |
|---|---|---|---|---|---|---|---|---|
| 2015 | France | WJC18 D1A | 3rd | 5 | 2 | 0 | 2 | 12 |
| 2016 | France | WJC18 D1A | 4th | 5 | 2 | 4 | 6 | 6 |
| 2017 | France | WJC D1A | 3rd | 5 | 1 | 7 | 8 | 4 |
| 2017 | France | WJC18 D1A | 1st | 5 | 2 | 3 | 5 | 6 |
| 2018 | France | WJC D1A | 4th | 5 | 0 | 4 | 4 | 8 |
| 2018 | France | WC | 12th | 7 | 0 | 3 | 3 | 10 |
| 2019 | France | WC | 15th | 7 | 1 | 2 | 3 | 6 |
| 2021 | France | OGQ | DNQ | 3 | 2 | 2 | 4 | 0 |
| 2022 | France | WC | 12th | 7 | 3 | 2 | 5 | 6 |
| 2023 | France | WC | 12th | 6 | 0 | 1 | 1 | 25 |
| 2024 | France | OGQ | Q | 3 | 3 | 3 | 6 | 0 |
| 2025 | France | WC | 16th | 5 | 0 | 3 | 3 | 8 |
| 2026 | France | OG | 11th | 4 | 0 | 0 | 0 | 0 |
| Junior totals | | | | 25 | 7 | 18 | 25 | 36 |
| Senior totals | | | | 42 | 9 | 16 | 25 | 55 |

== Awards and honours ==
| Award | Year |
Ligue Magnus
| Jean-Pierre Graff Trophy | 2017 |
| Coupe de France | 2017 |
