= Anders Andersen =

Anders Andersen may refer to:

- Anders Andersen (Norwegian politician) (1846–1931), Norwegian politician, founder of the Norwegian Labour Party
- Anders Ejnar Andersen, Danish politician, finance minister, 1973–1975
- Anders Andersen (wrestler) (1881–1961), Danish Greco-Roman wrestler in the 1908 Summer Olympics
- Anders Andersen (speedway rider) (born 1988), Danish motorcycle speedway rider
- Anders Hartington Andersen (1907–1996), Danish marathon runner, 1932-6 Olympics

== See also ==
- Anders Andersson (disambiguation)
