= Henrik Nilsson (ice hockey, born 1970) =

Swedish ice hockey player (born 1970)

- Born: January 10, 1970 (age 56) Salem, Sweden
- Height: 5 ft 10 in (178 cm)
- Weight: 192 lb (87 kg; 13 st 10 lb)
- Position: Centre
- Shot: Right
- Played for: Hammarby IF; Västerås IK; Västra Frölunda HC
- Playing career: 1987–2005

Sven Arne Henrik Nilsson (born January 10, 1970) is a Swedish retired professional ice hockey player. He played for Västra Frölunda HC and Västerås IK in Elitserien, and for Hammarby IF in Allsvenskan.

== Career statistics ==
			Regular season					Playoffs
Season	Team	League	GP	G	A	Pts	PIM	GP	G	A	Pts	PIM
1987–88	Hammarby IF	DIV1	28	10	11	21	4	3	0	1	1	0
1988–89	Hammarby IF	DIV1	32	6	8	14	12	2	0	0	0	0
1989–90	Hammarby IF	DIV1	32	20	24	44	22	5	3	3	6	6
1990–91	Västerås IK	SEL	39	12	15	27	4	4	0	1	1	0
1991–92	Västerås IK	SEL	40	15	15	30	18	–	–	–	–	–
1992–93	Västerås IK	SEL	25	5	8	13	8	3	0	1	1	2
1993–94	Västerås IK	SEL	29	6	7	13	10	4	0	0	0	0
1994–95	Västerås IK	SEL	40	4	7	11	10	4	0	1	1	0
1995–96	Västra Frölunda HC	SEL	36	10	12	22	8	13	3	3	6	0
1996–97	Västra Frölunda HC	SEL	39	6	13	19	8	3	1	1	2	2
1997–98	Västra Frölunda HC	SEL	41	8	5	13	12	4	0	1	1	0
1998–99	Västra Frölunda HC	SEL	42	6	14	20	8	4	0	0	0	2
1999–00	Västra Frölunda HC	SEL	50	3	13	16	10	5	0	0	0	2
2000–01	Västra Frölunda HC	SEL	49	3	9	12	16	5	1	1	2	2
2001–02	Hammarby IF	ALSV	40	13	20	33	20	2	1	2	3	0
2002–03	Hammarby IF	ALSV	40	9	22	31	8	10	2	2	4	2
2003–04	Hammarby IF	ALSV	43	8	23	31	8	10	1	5	6	4
2004–05	Hammarby IF	ALSV	42	10	12	22	18	–	–	–	–	–
SEL totals			430	78	118	196	112	49	5	11	16	8

Preceded by Christian Ruuttu	Frölunda HC captains 1996–2000	Succeeded by Mikael Andersson
