= Ville Andersson =

Finnish diplomat and former footballer (born 1972)

Personal information
- Date of birth: 21 December 1972 (age 53)
- Place of birth: Helsinki, Finland
- Position: Defender

Senior career*
Years	Team	Apps	(Gls)
1989	EPS		
1990	Espoo		
1991	FinnPa	6	(0)
1992	Espoo		
1993–1998	FinnPa	97	(2)
1999–2000	Enköping	35	(3)
2001–2002	Red Star	17	(1)
2002	RoPS	8	(0)
2003–2004	FCK Salamat	17	(2)
- * Club domestic league appearances and goals

Ville Andersson (born 21 December 1972) is a Finnish former professional footballer who played as a midfielder. During his playing career, Andersson made 97 appearances in Finnish top level Veikkausliiga for FinnPa, scoring two goals. Besides Finland, he also played for Enköping in Swedish second tier and for Red Star in French fourth tier.

He is currently working as a diplomat for the Ministry of Foreign Affairs.

His father was Finnish politician Claes Andersson.
