= Rönninge =

Municipal district in Sweden

Coordinates: 59°11′37″N 17°44′58″E

Rönninge is a residential area in Salem Municipality, Stockholm County, Sweden. Statistically it is a part of the bimunicipal contiguously built-up Tumba urban area.

The railway Stockholm - Södertälje was opened in 1861. By the beginning of the 1900s a settlement began to grow. A school house was built in 1906. The population of Rönninge is today about 4,300.

Rönninge has a station on the Stockholm commuter rail network's Södertälje line.

== Sports ==
The following sports clubs are located in Rönninge:

- Rönninge/Salem Fotboll
- Rönninge SK
