= Eva Andersson =

There are several people named Eva Andersson:

- Eva Andersson (swimmer), Eva Maria "Tjorven" Andersson, Swedish Olympic swimmer born 1957
- Eva Andersson-Dubin, born Eva Birgitta Andersson, Swedish-American physician and model, born 1961
- Eva Andersson (footballer), "Lill-Eva", Swedish football player, born 1963
- Eva Andersson (curler), Swedish curler born 1970

== See also ==
- ArsDigita, co-founded by Eve Andersson
