= Axel Andersson i Österfärnebo =

Swedish politician

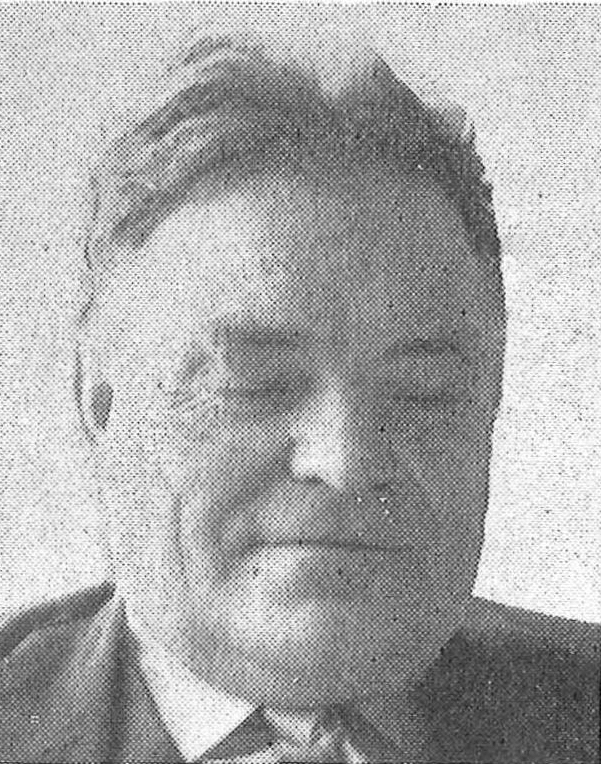
Axel Andersson

Axel Andersson i Österfärnebo (1 August 1897 – 4 February 1979) was a Swedish Centrist and politician. He was a member of the First Chamber of Parliament in 1957, elected by county vote. While in Parliament, he held the title of Österfärnebo, and was a Counselor.
