= Mats Andersson =

Swedish financier and asset manager

Mats Andersson, born 1954, is a Swedish financier and asset manager. After previous work at Warburg, Deutsche Bank, and Skandia Liv, he assumed the role as CEO for one of Sweden's major pension funds Fjärde AP-fonden (AP4) where he led the work to redirect investments in the energy sector towards fossil free companies within the government directive Fossilfritt Sverige (Fossil Free Sweden) that engages more than 200 companies, municipalities, counties, regions, and other organizations. He also actively collaborated with the United Nations to raise awareness of the risks climate change brings, from a finance and investment perspective.

Andersson was a driving force behind the project Portfolio Decarbonization Coalition (PDC) that was founded and co-financed by AP4 along with United Nations Environment Programme Finance Initiative (UNEP FI), Amundi, and the Carbon Disclosure Project (CDP). The initiative was implemented by Andersson by having AP4 significantly reduce or let go entirely of held shares in American companies with a large carbon footprint, combined with a strategy for investments on emerging markets in companies with a small footprint.

Andersson was awarded the Chief Investment Officer's Lifetime Achievement Award in 2016. In 2015 he was ranked fifth on the Financial News "100 Most Influential List" in the pension fund category, and the same year fourth on the Sovereign Wealth Fund Institutes "Public Investor 100" list.

He left AP4 in March 2016 to, among other things, act as Vice Chairman of the Global Challenges Foundation with special focus on global governance and global catastrophic risks. In December 2016 he was appointed Royal Commissioner by the Swedish government to "map how the market for green bonds can be promoted.
