= John Andersson =

Swedish footballer

Personal information
- Full name: John Andersson
- Position: Defender

Senior career*
Years	Team	Apps	(Gls)
1934–1940	Malmö FF	43	(11)
- * Club domestic league appearances and goals

John Andersson was a Swedish footballer who played as a defender.
