= Tumba, Sweden =

Tumba
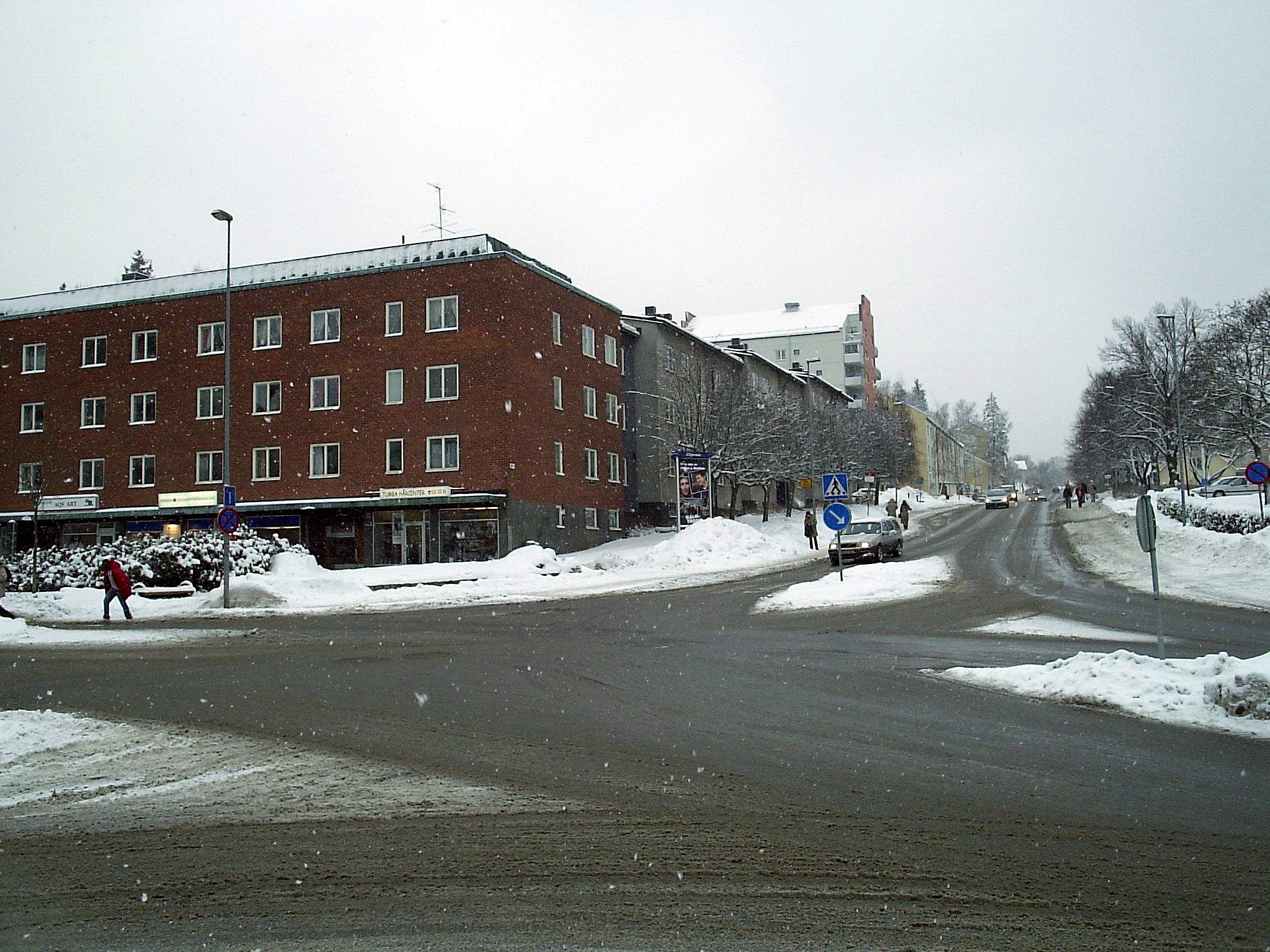
- Tumba in February 2006

- Location within Stockholm Location within Sweden Location within European Union
- Coordinates: 59°12′N 17°49′E
- Country: Sweden
- Province: Södermanland
- County: Stockholm County
- Municipality: Botkyrka Municipality and Salem Municipality

Area
  - Total: 17.74 km^{2} (6.85 sq mi)

Population (31 December 2020)
  - Total: 46,014
  - Density: 2,594/km^{2} (6,718/sq mi)
- Time zone: UTC+1 (CET)
  - Summer (DST): UTC+2 (CEST)

Tumba is a bimunicipal locality and the seat of Botkyrka Municipality in Stockholm County, Sweden with 37,852 inhabitants in 2010. A part of its statistical urban area, called Rönninge, is in Salem Municipality. The population is 35,311 (2005). The Swedish krona banknotes are printed by Crane AB at Tumba Bruk, in Tumba. Tumba is situated half-way between Stockholm and Södertälje and is considered a Stockholm suburb. In Tumba and Rönninge there are stations on the Stockholm commuter rail network.

Tumba also has a High School (Tumba gymnasium) with almost 1.000 students. The Alfa Laval company was founded in Tumba by Gustaf de Laval and remains in the suburb, as does DeLaval, split from Alfa Laval in 1991. Tumba is diverse, with high-rise apartment buildings and single-family houses. Tumba also has a shopping mall, Tumba Centrum, near the railway station.

The melodic death metal band Amon Amarth is from Tumba.

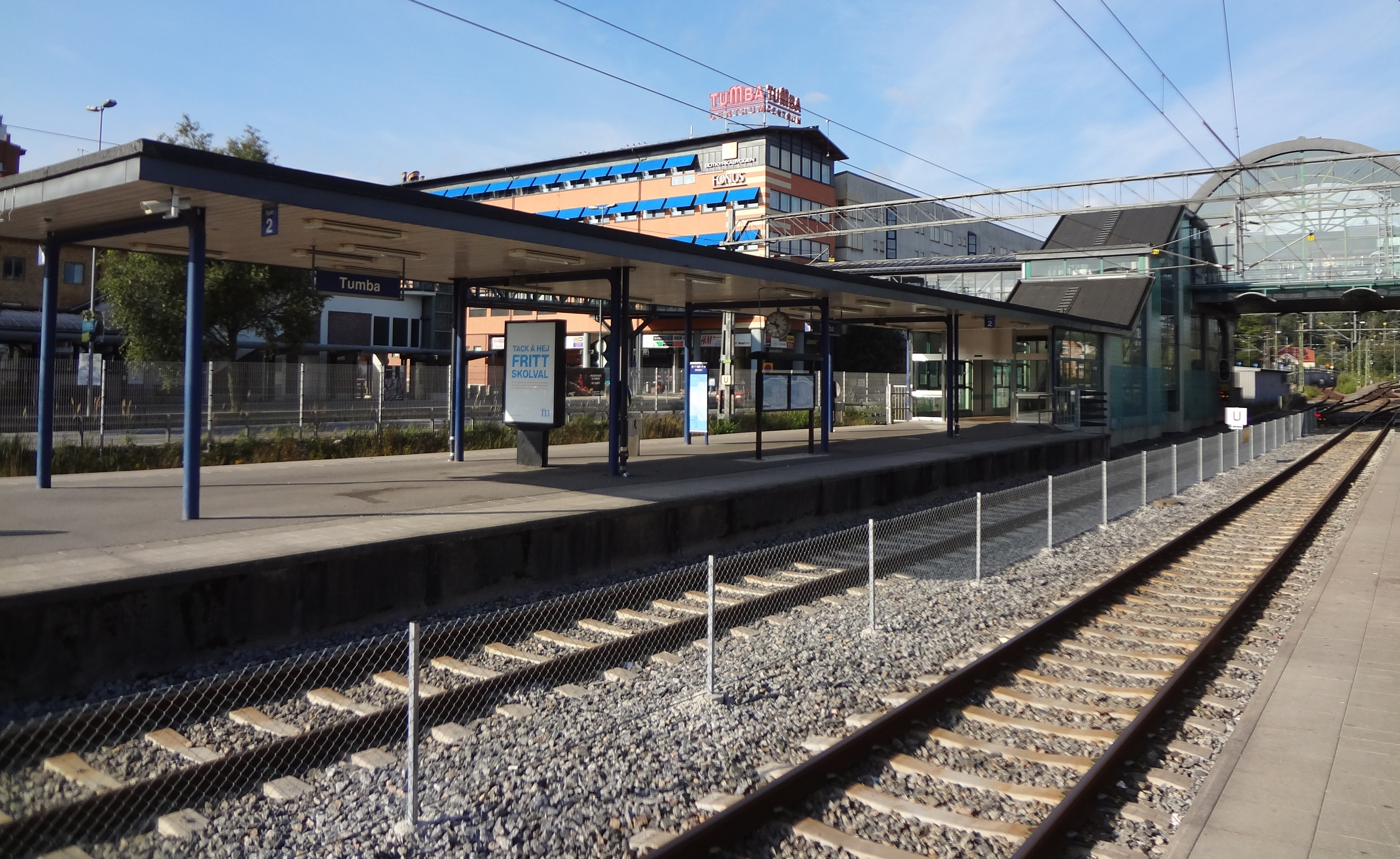
Tumba railway station

== History ==
What makes Tumba different from the communities in northern Botkyrka is that it doesn’t stem from a big farm with historic roots. The people of prehistory preferred to live close to the shores. Tumba was an inland country. That’s why traces of human activity during prehistory are relatively rare. The big change took place during 1755 when the bank of Sweden bought a small farm and started a paper mill. Around the paper mill came a community that developed with its own school and houses for the workers to live in. The next big step was taken when the railroad came in 1860. Soon afterwards a society started to grow around the station house. This society had commerce, police, and a movie theatre. A few houses from that period are still left. In 1894 ‘Separator’ (DeLaval) bought Hamra gård and transformed it into a farm specialized in milk processing. It soon became a big industry. From the beginning these three parts were separate but grew together. The communities of both the papermill and Hamra are well kept.

== Districts ==
- Vretarna
- Tuna
- Nackdala
- Tumba park
- Tumba centrum
- Storvreten
- Lövholmen
- Skäcklinge
- Kassmyra
- Broängen
- Solbo
- Tumba villastad
- Segersjö
- Uttran

== Demographics ==
| Municipality | Population in Tumba |
|---|---|
| Botkyrka Municipality | 21,140 |
| Salem Municipality | 14,171 |
| Total | 35,311 |

== Sports ==
The following sports clubs are located in Tumba:

- IFK Tumba FK
- IFK Tumba Hockey

== Notable people ==
- Sven "X-et" Leonard Erixson, (1899–1970), Swedish painter and sculptor.
- Anna Christensen (1936-2001), Swedish professor and columnist
