= Gunnar Andersson =

Gunnar Andersson may refer to:

- Gunnar Andersson (footballer) (1928–1969), Swedish footballer
- Gunnar Andersson (trade unionist) (1890–1946), Swedish trade unionist
- Gunnar Andersson (politician) (1896–1956), Finnish politician
- Gunnar Andersson (aviator) (1923–1974), Swedish aviator
- Johan Gunnar Andersson (1874–1960), Swedish geologist and archaeologist
