= Anders Andersson =

Anders Andersson may refer to:

- Anders Andersson (footballer) (born 1974), former Swedish football forward and TV pundit
- Anders Andersson (ice hockey) (1937–1989), Swedish ice hockey centre in the 1950s and 1960s
- Anders Andersson (sport shooter) (1875–1945), Swedish sport shooter who competed in the 1920 Summer Olympics
- Anders Andersson (canoeist) (born 1952), Swedish sprint canoer who competed in the late 1970s and early 1980s
- Anders Andersson (actor) (born 1952), Swedish actor
- Anders Andersson (Christian Democrat politician) (born 1955), Swedish politician
- Anders Andersson (Moderate politician) (1928–1989), Swedish politician

== See also ==
- Anders Andersen (disambiguation)
