= Conny Andersson =

Conny Andersson may refer to:

- Conny Andersson (racing driver) (born 1939), Swedish former racing driver
- Conny Andersson (footballer) (born 1945), Swedish former footballer
