= Björn Andersson =

Björn Andersson may refer to:

- Bjorn Anderson (filmmaker), American independent film producer and director
- Björn Andrésen (1955–2025), Swedish actor and musician
- Björn Andersson (footballer, born 1951), Swedish footballer
- Björn Andersson (handballer) (born 1950), Swedish Olympic handballer
- Björn Andersson (footballer, born 1982), Swedish footballer
- Björn Andersson (speedway rider) (born 1962), Swedish motorcycle speedway rider

== See also ==
- Bjørn Andersen (disambiguation)
