= Lukáš Daneček =

Czech ice hockey player

- Born: March 9, 1988 (age 38)
- Height: 5 ft 9 in (175 cm)
- Weight: 161 lb (73 kg; 11 st 7 lb)
- Position: Goaltender
- Catches: Right
- Czech Extraliga team: HC Oceláři Třinec
- Playing career: 2006–present

Lukáš Daneček (born March 9, 1988, in Havířov) is a Czech professional ice hockey goaltender. He played with HC Oceláři Třinec in the Czech Extraliga during the 2010–11 Czech Extraliga season.
