= Emil Andersson =

Emil Andersson may refer to:

- Emil Andersson (sport shooter) (born 1979), Swedish running target shooter
- Emil Andersson (table tennis) (born 1993), Swedish table tennis player
