= Olle Andersson =

Olle Andersson may refer to:

- Olle Andersson (tennis) (1895–1974), Swedish tennis player
- Olle Andersson (speedway rider) (1932–2017), Swedish speedway rider
