= Rönninge SK =

Sports club in Rönninge, Sweden

- Full name: Rönninge sportklubb
- Sport: soccer, table tennis
- Based in: Rönninge, Sweden

Rönninge SK is a sports club in Rönninge, Sweden. The women's soccer team played six seasons in the Swedish top division between 1982 and 1987.

Also scoring table tennis successes, the club won the Swedish women's national team championship in 2002.
