= Edoff Andersson =

Swedish politician and trade unionist

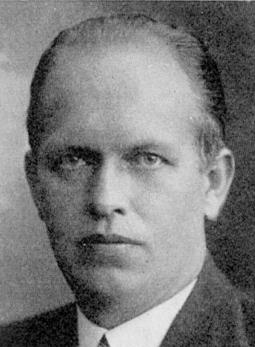

Member of the Swedish Parliament for Stockholm Municipality
- In office 1928–1934

Personal details
- Born: Edoff Emanuel Andersson; 2 July 1892; Salem, Sweden
- Died: 18 June 1934 (aged 41)
- Political party: Social Democrat (–1917), Left Socialist/Communist (1917–1929), Communist (Kilbom wing)/Socialist (1929–1934)
- Profession: Trade unionist

Edoff Emanuel Andersson (2 July 1892 – 18 June 1934) was a Swedish politician and trade unionist. He was a prominent union leader of the civilian employees in the defense sector as well as a communist member of parliament.

Andersson was a munitions factory worker. When the Social Democratic Labour Party was split and the Social Democratic Left Party (later renamed the Communist Party of Sweden) was formed, Andersson joined the new party. He was one of the prominent figures in the trade unionist sector in the Communist Party (alongside party colleagues such as Herman Johansson and Arvid Olsson). Andersson served as the 'first ombudsman' of the Civilian Defense Employees Union. Whilst his party supported cuts in military spending, Andersson (a former defense industry worker himself) considered the abolition of militarism an impossibility whilst capitalism persisted.

Andersson was elected to parliament in the 1928 elections.

In October 1929 the Communist Party passed through a major split, as Karl Kilbom, Nils Flyg and their followers were expelled from the party by the Executive Committee of the Communist International (through its representative Kullervo Manner). The expellees regrouped as a separate Communist Party of Sweden, later renamed Socialist Party. Andersson became a member of this Kilbom-led Communist Party. He was one of the most prominent labour leaders of the party.

Andersson was elected to the Central Committee of the Kilbom-led Communist Party in 1932. In the factional disputes between Kilbom and Flyg, Andersson retained an independent position. He was critical of Kilbom's positions but did not belong to the grouping around Flyg. When the party was negotiating a merger with Albin Ström's faction of dissident Social Democrats, Andersson proposed the name 'Socialist Workers Party' as the name of the unified party. Andersson stressed that it was important to emphasize the class character of the party. Andersson's proposal was voted down and the name 'Socialist Party' was adopted (seeking to appeal to a broader constituency inside as well as outside the industrial working class).

Andersson died in 1934. His death was a heavy blow to the Socialist Party. His parliamentary seat was filled by Arvid Olsson.
