= List of foreign Allsvenskan players =

This is a list of foreign players in Allsvenskan, which commenced play in 1924. The following players must meet both of the following two criteria:

1. have played at least one Allsvenskan game. Players who were signed by Allsvenskan clubs, but only played in lower league, cup and/or European games, or did not play in any competitive games at all, are not included.
2. are considered foreign, determined by the following:

A player is considered foreign if he is not eligible to play for Sweden men's national football team.

More specifically,

- If a player has been capped on international level, the national team is used; if he has been capped by more than one country, the highest level (or the most recent) team is used.
- If a player has not been capped on international level, his country of birth is used, except those who were born abroad from Swedish parents or moved to Sweden at a young age, and those who clearly indicated to have switched his nationality to another nation.

Clubs listed are those which the player has played at least one Allsvenskan game for.

In bold: players who have played at least one Allsvenskan game in the most recent season (2024 Allsvenskan), and are still at the clubs for which they have played. This does not include current players of an Allsvenskan club who have not played an Allsvenskan game in the current season.

== Background ==
Ronald Powell, who played for Brynäs IF in the 1974 season, was the first foreign player in Allsvenskan. Around 20 years later, in 1995, 18 foreign players played matches in the league, while in 2021, it had increased to 110 foreign players, being 28 percent of the players in the league that year.

For the match squad, the limit of foreign players refers to if the players are home-grown or not. Starting in the 2010s, each match squad of 18 players were to consist maximally to the half of not home-grown players. For the 2023 season, when the total match squad size for Allsvenskan was increased from 18 to 20, the amount of non-home-grown players in the squad, would still be to the maximum half of the squad, however never more than 9.

A foreign player must have a work permit, which they may earn when having a monthly salary of SEK 14,300.

== List of players ==
=== Afghanistan ===
- Sharif Mukhammad – AFC Eskilstuna – 2017
- Farshad Noor – AFC Eskilstuna – 2017

=== Albania ===
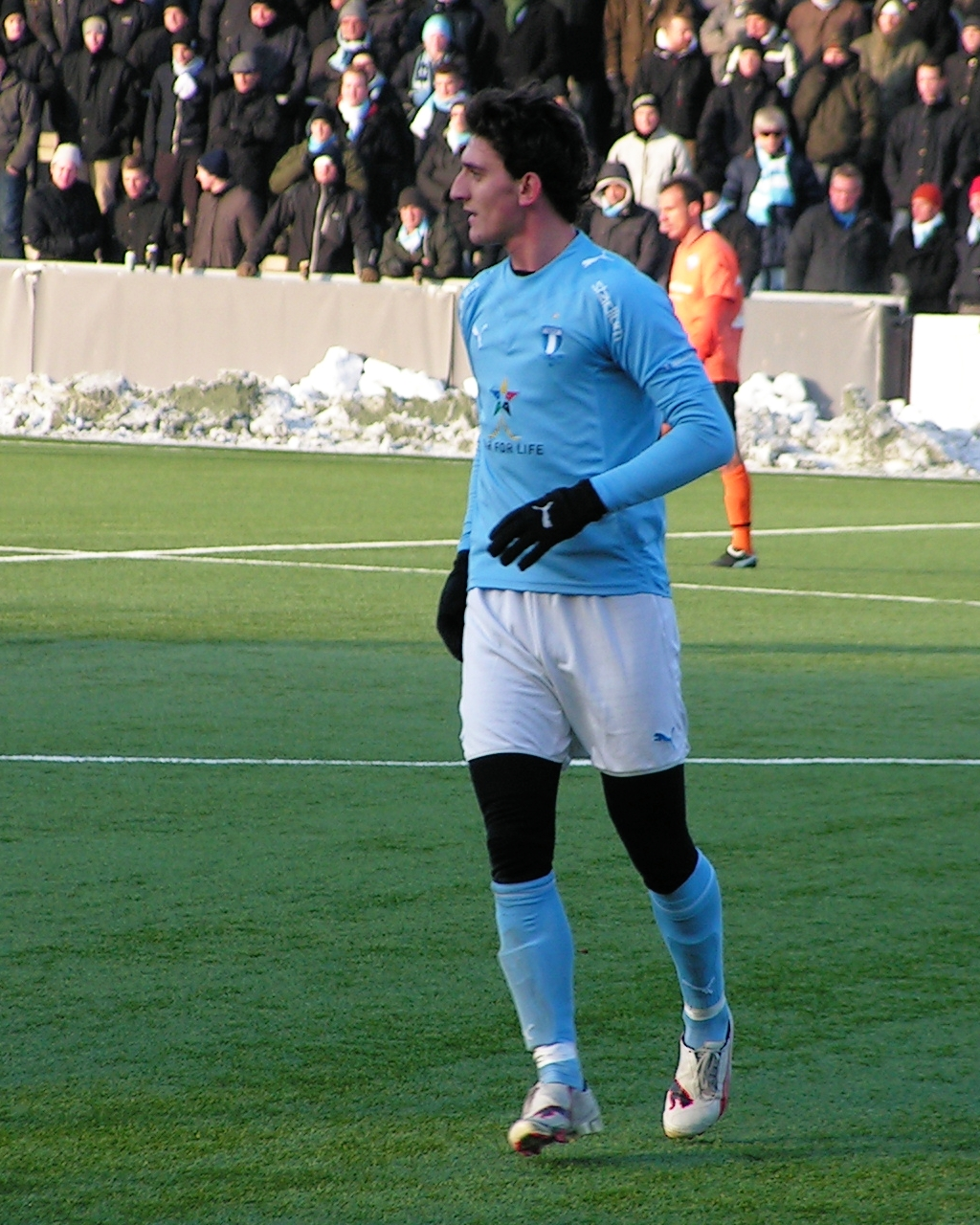
Agon Mehmeti has played 144 Allsvenskan matches for Malmö FF and Örebro.

- Albion Ademi – Djurgården, Värnamo – 2021–23
- Astrit Ajdarević – Örebro, Norrköping, Helsingborg, Djurgården – 2010–2012, 2015–2016, 2019–2020
- Jasir Asani – AIK – 2020
- **Etrit Berisha** – Kalmar, **Häcken** – 2008–2013, 2025–
- Egzon Binaku – Häcken, Malmö FF, Norrköping, GAIS – 2015–2024
- Gent Elezaj – Hammarby – 2024
- Agon Mehmeti – Malmö FF, Örebro – 2008–2011, 2014–2015, 2019–2021
- Migen Memelli – GAIS – 2007–2008
- Agon Muçolli – Varberg – 2023
- **Arbnor Muçolli** – **IFK Göteborg** – 2023–
- Valdet Rama – Örebro – 2011–2012

=== Algeria ===
- Samir Beloufa – Helsingborg – 2007
- Dalil Benyahia – Brommapojkarna – 2009–2010

=== Angola ===
- Yamba Asha – Öster – 2006
- Paulo Figueiredo – Öster – 2006
- Dominique Kivuvu – Mjällby – 2012
- Rui Modesto – AIK – 2023–2024
- Vá – Djurgården – 2023

=== Argentina ===
- Martín Crossa – IFK Göteborg – 2003
- Gabriel Ferreyra – AIK – 2014
- Franco Miranda – Helsingborg – 2006–2007
- Pablo Monsalvo – AIK – 2007
- Iván Obolo – AIK – 2007–2009
- Jorge Ortiz – AIK – 2008–2010
- Lucho Rodríguez – Djurgården – 2010
- José Shaffer – IFK Göteborg – 2006
- Luis Solignac – Djurgården – 2013
- Nicolás Stefanelli – AIK – 2017–2018, 2021–2022
- Lucas Valdemarín – AIK – 2007–2008

=== Armenia ===
- **André Calisir** – Djurgården, Jönköpings Södra, IFK Göteborg, **Brommapojkarna** – 2010–2011, 2016–2020, 2023–
- Yura Movsisyan – Djurgården – 2018
- Levon Pachajyan – GAIS – 2008

=== Australia ===
- Nic Bosevski – Norrköping – 2002
- Luke Casserly – AIK – 2000–2002
- Ante Covic – Hammarby, Elfsborg – 2002–2006, 2009–2011
- Alex Gersbach – Kalmar – 2024
- Scott Jamieson – IFK Göteborg – 2016–2017
- Peter Makrillos – GIF Sundsvall – 2022
- Nik Mrdja – AIK – 2004
- Joseph Spiteri – Norrköping – 2001

=== Austria ===
- Roman Kienast – Helsingborg – 2008
- Michael Langer – Norrköping – 2016–2017
- Thomas Piermayr – AFC Eskilstuna – 2017
- Michael Steinwender – Värnamo – 2024

=== Azerbaijan ===
- Emin Nouri – Öster, Kalmar – 2006, 2008–2021
- Anatoli Ponomarev – Kalmar, GAIS – 2005, 2007
- Igor Ponomaryov – Norrköping – 1989
- Musa Qurbanlı – Djurgården – 2023–2024

=== Barbados ===
- Jamal Blackman – Östersund – 2016

=== Belarus ===
- Sergei Aleinikov – Oddevold – 1996
- Artsyom Rakhmanaw – AFC Eskilstuna – 2019
- Dzyanis Sashcheka – Halmstad – 2005
- Pilip Vaitsiakhovich – Värnamo – 2022–2023

=== Belgium ===
- Samuel Asoma – Västerås – 2024
- Bernard Beuken – Malmö FF – 1996
- **Hervé Matthys** – **AIK** – 2026–
- Yanis Mbombo – Örebro – 2017
- Stefan Van Riel – Trelleborg – 1998

=== Benin ===
- Yosif Ayuba – Djurgården – 2009–2010
- Mattéo Ahlinvi – Västerås – 2024
- Razak Omotoyossi – Helsingborg, GAIS, Syrianska – 2007–2008, 2011

=== Bosnia and Herzegovina ===
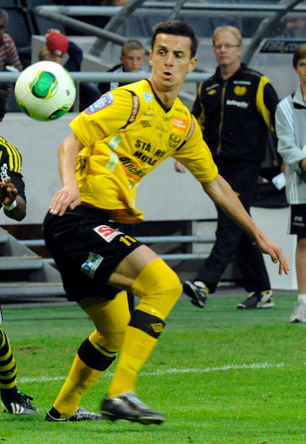
Haris Radetinac has played 278 Allsvenskan matches for Åtvidaberg, Mjällby and Djurgården.

- Admir Aganović – Syrianska – 2012
- Anel Ahmedhodžić – Malmö FF – 2019–2021
- **Dino Beširović** – **AIK** – 2023–
- Almir Buhić – Örebro – 1996
- **Kenan Busuladžić** – **Malmö FF** – 2024–
- **Anes Čardaklija** – **GAIS** – 2024–
- Ismet Crnalić – Brage – 1986
- Ranko Đorđić – Norrköping – 1985–1988
- Armin Gigović – Helsingborg – 2019–2020, 2022
- Dennis Hadžikadunić – Malmö FF, Trelleborg – 2016–2018, 2022
- Nedim Halilović – Örebro – 2007–2008
- Irfan Jašarević – Dalkurd – 2018
- Nikola Jokišić – Norrköping, Häcken – 1994
- Dragan Kapčević – Gefle, Sirius – 2010–2011, 2017
- Aleksandar Kitić – Ljungskile – 2008
- Sulejman Krpić – AIK – 2017
- Darko Mavrak – Djurgården, Norrköping – 1995–1997
- Enes Muhić – Öster – 1992
- Adi Nalić – AFC Eskilstuna, Malmö FF, Hammarby – 2019–2023
- Nebojša Novaković – Djurgården, AIK – 1995–2001
- Haris Radetinac – Åtvidaberg, Mjällby, Djurgården – 2010, 2012–2024
- Radoslav Radulović – Enköping – 2003
- Ivan Ristić – Syrianska – 2011
- Amir Teljigović – Trelleborg – 1997–1998

=== Bolivia ===
- Martin Smedberg-Dalence – IFK Göteborg, Ljungskile, Norrköping – 2005, 2008, 2011–2017

=== Brazil ===
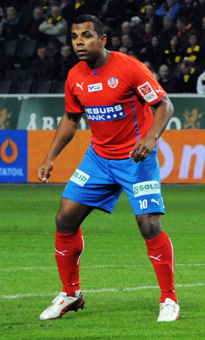
Álvaro Santos has played 165 Allsvenskan matches for Helsingborg, Örgryte and GAIS.

- Aílton – Örgryte – 2004–2006
- Alex Pereira – Örgryte, Syrianska, AIK – 2009, 2011–2013, 2015
- Alex – Hammarby – 2016
- Alysson – Kalmar – 2002
- Afonso Alves – Örgryte, Malmö FF – 2002–2003, 2004–2006
- Anselmo – Halmstad – 2008–2010
- Ari – Kalmar – 2006–2007
- Lourival Assis – Kalmar – 2009
- Fábio Augusto – Kalmar – 2004–2007
- Daniel Bamberg – Norrköping, Örebro – 2008, 2012
- Berger – Enköping – 2003
- Bernardo Vilar – IFK Göteborg, Värnamo – 2021–2023
- Neto Borges – Hammarby – 2018
- Bosco – Örgryte – 2003
- **Gabriel Busanello** – **Malmö FF** – 2023–
- Pablo Campos – GAIS – 2008
- Leandro Castán – Helsingborg – 2007
- Cláudio – Hammarby – 2009
- Clécio – AIK – 2010
- Ricardo Costa – Örebro – 2003–2004
- Dedé – Hammarby, Kalmar – 2003–2005
- Eduardo Delani – Halmstad – 2005
- Denilson – Helsingborg – 2008
- Diego Fumaça – Helsingborg – 2022
- Eduardo – Örebro – 2003
- Éliton Júnior – Varberg – 2022–2023
- Elvis – Hammarby – 2003
- Enrico – Djurgården – 2006–2008
- Erick Brendon – Värnamo – 2022
- Fabio – Örebro – 2018, 2020
- Wílton Figueiredo – AIK, Malmö FF – 2006–2007, 2009–2012
- Antônio Flávio – AIK – 2009–2010
- Bruno Fogaça – Elfsborg – 2001
- **Ricardo Friedrich** – Kalmar, **Malmö FF** – 2022–
- Gabriel – Malmö FF – 2006–2009
- Gerlem Willian – Syrianska – 2013
- Givaldo – Kalmar – 2007
- Paulinho Guará – Örgryte, Hammarby, Örebro – 2002–2008, 2010–2011
- Odair Hellman – Enköping – 2003
- Pedro Henrique – Kalmar – 2011
- Hiago – Kalmar – 2018
- Ismael Silva – Kalmar – 2013–2017
- Jael – Kalmar – 2010
- Jajá – Kalmar – 2018
- Jean – Hammarby, Varberg, Norrköping – 2019–2022
- Júnior – Malmö FF – 2006–2007
- Kayke – Häcken – 2010–2011
- Igor Santos Koppe – Syrianska – 2013
- Vinícius Lopes – Häcken – 2008–2010
- Gabriel Machado – Syrianska – 2013
- Rafael Magalhães – Hammarby – 2009
- Maxwell – Kalmar – 2019
- Maranhão – Häcken – 2011
- Marinho – Hammarby – 2004
- Bruno Marinho – Åtvidaberg – 2010, 2012, 2014–2015
- Gustavo Martins – Landskrona – 2002
- Alexandre Matão – GAIS – 2008
- Thiago Matos – Kalmar – 2006
- Caio Mendes – Norrköping – 2011
- Daniel Mendes – AIK, Kalmar – 2006–2013
- Daniel Morais – GAIS – 2008–2009
- Adriano Munoz – Örebro – 2009
- Netinho – Värnamo – 2022–2023
- Nixon – Kalmar – 2018
- Vinícius Nogueira – Varberg, Halmstad – 2023–2024
- Diogo Oliveira – Kalmar – 2004
- Thiago Oliveira – Kalmar – 2007
- Pablo Dyego – Djurgården – 2013
- Patrick Luan – Örebro – 2021
- Paulinho – Häcken, Örebro, Hammarby – 2007–2011, 2015–2021
- Piracaia – AIK – 1997–1998
- Michel Pires – Sundsvall – 2012
- Rafael Porcellis – Helsingborg – 2009–2010
- Thiago Quirino – Djurgården – 2006–2008
- Rafinha – Kalmar – 2019–2020
- Reinaldo – Helsingborg – 2002
- Claudinei Resende – Helsingborg – 2004
- Pedro Ribeiro – Västerås – 2024
- Ricardinho – Malmö FF – 2009–2014
- Robério – Örgryte – 2004
- João Rodrigo – Öster – 2003
- Leandro Rodrigues – Kalmar – 2009
- Romarinho – GAIS, Kalmar – 2009–2024
- Rômulo – Hammarby – 2016–2017
- Marcelo Sá – Örgryte – 2004
- Marcel Sacramento – Kalmar – 2008, 2010
- César Santin – Kalmar – 2004–2008
- Álvaro Santos – Helsingborg, Örgryte, GAIS – 2000–2003, 2009, 2011–2014
- Bruno Santos – Norrköping – 2011
- Ricardo Santos – Kalmar, Djurgården, Åtvidaberg – 2007, 2009–2014
- Márcio Saraiva – AIK – 2006
- Álberis da Silva – Åtvidaberg – 2010, 2012–2015
- Reinaldo da Silva – Kalmar – 2009
- Rogério Silva – Helsingborg – 2001
- Daniel Sobralense – Kalmar, IFK Göteborg, Örebro – 2008–2014
- Thiago – Trelleborg – 2011
- Tiago – Helsingborg – 2003
- Valter Tomaz Júnior – Örgryte – 1998–2006
- Bruno Tonheta – Landskrona – 2002
- Douglas Vieira – Kalmar – 2010
- Wánderson Cavalcante Melo – AFC Eskilstuna – 2017
- Wánderson – GAIS, Helsingborg – 2007–2012, 2019
- Wenderson – Värnamo, Elfsborg – 2022–2025

=== Bulgaria ===
- Mihail Ivanov – AFC Eskilstuna – 2019
- Plamen Nikolov – Brage – 1986
- Emil Spassov – Brage – 1986
- **Yanis Karabelyov** – **Malmö FF** – 2026–

=== Burkina Faso ===
- Ibrahim Bancé – Helsingborg – 2019
- Adama Guira – Djurgården – 2011
- **Elohim Kaboré** – **Hammarby** – 2025–

=== Burundi ===
- **Frédéric Nsabiyumva** – **Västerås** – 2024, 2026–
- Marco Weymans – Östersund – 2019–2021

=== Cameroon ===
- **Saidou Alioum** – Hammarby, **IFK Göteborg** – 2023, 2025–
- Eric Ayuk – Jönköping – 2017
- Eric Bassombeng – Örebro, GAIS – 2008–2012
- Joseph Elanga – Malmö FF – 2000–2005, 2010
- Samuel Kotto – Malmö FF, Värnamo – 2023–2024
- Patrice Kwedi – IFK Göteborg – 2004
- Matthew Mbuta – Syrianska – 2012
- Joseph Nguijol – Gefle – 2005
- Alain Junior Ollé Ollé – Åtvidaberg – 2012
- **Christian Tchouante** – **Mjällby** – 2025–
- Bertin Zé Ndille – Örebro – 2008–2010

=== Canada ===
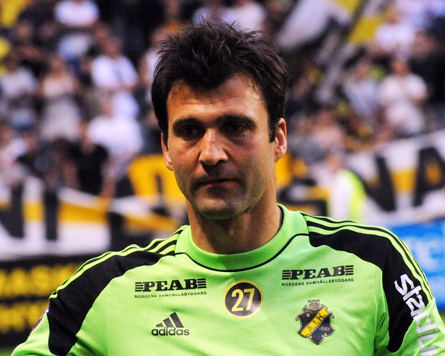
Kyriakos Stamatopoulos has played 67 Allsvenskan matches for Enköping and AIK.

- Sam Adekugbe – IFK Göteborg – 2017
- Stephen Ademolu – Trelleborg – 2004
- Fernando Aguiar – Landskrona – 2004
- Wyn Belotte – Norrköping – 2002
- Niki Budalić – Örebro – 2003
- Marco Bustos – Värnamo – 2023–2024
- Tomer Chencinski – Örebro, Helsingborg – 2012, 2016
- **Tiago Coimbra** – **IFK Göteborg** – 2026–
- Derek Cornelius – Malmö FF – 2023–2024
- Nick Dasovic – Trelleborg – 1996
- **Matteo de Brienne** – **GAIS** – 2025–
- Ali Gerba – GIF Sundsvall, IFK Göteborg – 2005–2007
- Marcus Godinho – Degerfors – 2025
- Atiba Hutchinson – Öster, Helsingborg – 2003–2005
- Chris Pozniak – Örebro – 2001–2003
- **Samuel Salter** – **GAIS** – 2026–
- Kyriakos Stamatopoulos – Enköping, AIK – 2003, 2010–2015, 2017
- Jonathan Viscosi – Sirius – 2020
- Mark Watson – Öster – 1997–1998

=== Cape Verde ===
- Kristopher Da Graca – IFK Göteborg, Sirius – 2017–2020, 2022–2023
- Mateus Lopes – Assyriska – 2005
- Sixten Mohlin – Dalkurd, Östersund – 2018–2019, 2021

=== Chad ===
- Azrack Mahamat – Halmstad – 2009

=== Chile ===
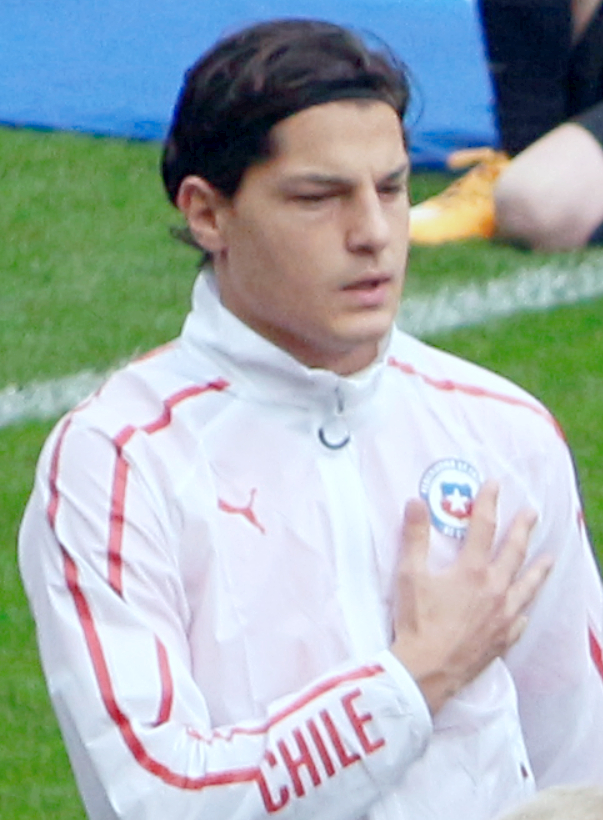
Miiko Albornoz has played 121 Allsvenskan matches for Brommapojkarna and Malmö FF.

- Miiko Albornoz – Brommapojkarna, Malmö FF – 2009–2014
- **Lucas Assadi** – **AIK** – 2026–
- Marko Biskupović – Kalmar – 2016–2017
- Juan Robledo – Mjällby, Öster – 2010, 2012–2013

=== Comoros ===
- Fouad Bachirou – Östersund, Malmö – 2016–2020

=== Congo ===
- **Bonaventure Lendambi** – **Västerås** – 2026–
- Noel Mbo – Helsingborg – 2019–2020
- Philippe Ndinga – Degerfors – 2025–2026
- Ravy Tsouka – Helsingborg – 2020, 2022

=== Costa Rica ===
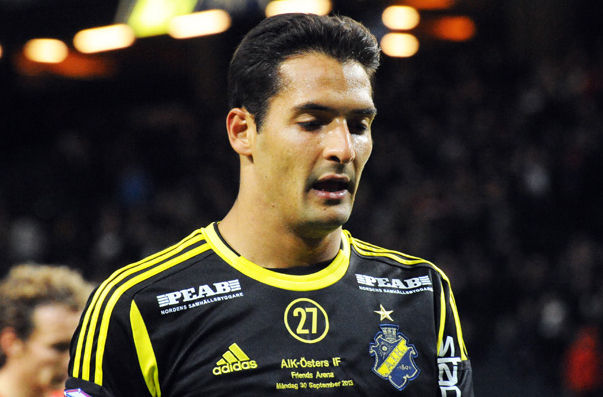
Celso Borges has played 71 Allsvenskan matches for AIK.

- Celso Borges – AIK – 2012–2014
- Diego Calvo – IFK Göteborg – 2014
- Diego Campos – Degerfors – 2022–2023
- Mayron George – Kalmar – 2020
- Jonathan McDonald – Kalmar – 2012–2013
- Christopher Meneses – Norrköping – 2013–2015
- Roy Miller – Örgryte – 2009
- Ian Smith – Norrköping – 2018–2019

=== Croatia ===
- Filip Ambrož – IFK Göteborg – 2021–2022
- Filip Benković – AIK – 2025
- Antonio Čolak – Malmö FF – 2021
- Ivica Cvitkušić – Djurgården – 1992
- Josip Filipović – Mjällby – 2021–2022
- Mario Jelavić – Åtvidaberg – 2015
- Goran Ljubojević – AIK – 2010
- Hrvoje Milić – Djurgården – 2009–2010
- Mario Musa – Hammarby – 2017
- Mate Šestan – Hammarby – 1999
- Nikola Tkalčić – Norrköping – 2011–2017
- Ivan Turina – AIK – 2010–2013
- Stipe Vrdoljak – AIK – 2017

=== Curaçao ===
- Anthony van den Hurk – Helsingborg – 2020, 2022

=== Cyprus ===
- **Andronikos Kakoullis** – **AIK** – 2025–
- Ioannis Pittas – AIK – 2023–2024

=== Czech Republic ===
- Matěj Chaluš – Malmö FF – 2022
- Martin Hyský – AIK – 1996
- Dušan Melichárek – Malmö FF – 2008–2009, 2011, 2019
- Pavel Zavadil – Öster, Örgryte – 2006, 2009

=== Denmark ===
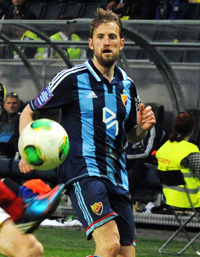
Peter Nymann has played 70 Allsvenskan matches for Djurgården.

- **Mads Agger** – **Häcken** – 2026–
- Nicolaj Agger – Djurgården – 2011
- Mads Albæk – IFK Göteborg – 2015–2017
- Bo Braastrup Andersen – Djurgården – 1999
- Jeppe Andersen – Hammarby – 2017–2022
- **Silas Andersen** – **Häcken** – 2025–
- Søren Andersen – Norrköping – 1995
- **Tobias Anker** – **Sirius** – 2025–
- Jakob Ankersen – IFK Göteborg – 2015–2016
- Morten Avnskjold – Landskrona – 2005
- Nikolai Baden – IFK Göteborg – 2024
- **Jonas Bager** – **IFK Göteborg** – 2024–
- **Marcus Baggesen** – Norrköping, **Västerås** – 2023–
- Christian Bank – Malmö FF – 1999
- **Kaare Barslund** – **Brommapojkarna** – 2024–
- Jesper Bech – Malmö FF – 2005–2006
- **Julius Beck** – **Elfsborg** – 2026–
- Mikkel Beckmann – Elfsborg – 2013–2014
- Mads Borchers – Varberg – 2023
- David Boysen – Elfsborg, Helsingborg – 2018–2019
- Marcus Bundgaard – Elfsborg – 2024
- **Frederik Christensen** – **Brommapojkarna** – 2024–
- Kim Christensen – IFK Göteborg – 2008–2010
- Martin Christensen – Åtvidaberg, Helsingborg – 2012–2016
- **Anders Christiansen** – **Malmö FF** – 2016–
- Jesper Christiansen – Elfsborg – 2010–2011
- Peter Christiansen – Helsingborg – 2005–2006
- Magnus Christensen – Öster – 2025
- **Eskild Dall** – **Kalmar** – 2026–
- **Villum Dalsgaard** – **Mjällby** – 2026–
- Finn Donnerborg – Åtvidaberg – 1978–1979
- Knud Engedahl – Västerås – 1978
- **Mads Enggård** – **Mjällby** – 2026–
- Mads Fenger – Hammarby – 2017–2024
- **Max Fenger** – Mjällby, **IFK Göteborg** – 2023, 2025–
- Viktor Fischer – AIK – 2023
- Peter Graulund – Helsingborg – 2004–2005
- **Pascal Gregor** – **Halmstad** – 2025–
- Jesper Håkansson – Djurgården – 2005
- Vito Hammershøy-Mistrati – Norrköping – 2023–2024
- Benjamin Hansen – AIK – 2023–2025
- **Mads Hansen** – **Brommapojkarna** – 2026–
- Jakob Haugaard – AIK – 2020
- **Sebastian Hausner** – IFK Göteborg, **AIK** – 2023–2024, 2026–
- Frederik Helstrup – Helsingborg – 2015–2016
- **Andreas Hermansen** – **GAIS** – 2026–
- Nichlas Hindsberg – Hammarby – 2005
- Frederik Holst – Elfsborg – 2018–2021
- Emil Holten – Elfsborg – 2024
- **Frederik Ihler** – **Elfsborg** – 2025–
- Adam Jakobsen – Brommapojkarna – 2024–2025
- **Alexander Jensen** – Brommapojkarna, **Elfsborg** – 2023–2024, 2026–
- Kasper Jensen – Djurgården – 2012
- Mikkel Jensen – Hammarby, Brommapojkarna – 2003–2010
- Sebastian Jørgensen – Malmö FF, Norrköping – 2023–2025
- **Simon Jørgensen** – **GAIS** – 2026–
- Thomas Juel-Nielsen – Falkenberg – 2016
- Magnus Kaastrup – Sirius – 2023
- Jakob Kiilerich – Mjällby – 2024–2025
- **Jeppe Kjær** – **Mjällby** – 2025–
- Jonas Knudsen – Malmö FF – 2019–2023
- Johnny Kongsbøg – Landskrona – 1994
- **David Kruse** – **IFK Göteborg** – 2024–
- Allan Kuhn – Örgryte – 1997–2000
- **Mikkel Ladefoged** – **Västerås** – 2026–
- Jesper Lange – Helsingborg – 2016
- **Peter Langhoff** – **Djurgården** – 2026–
- Kasper Larsen – Norrköping – 2018–2019
- Lars Larsen – Örebro – 2003–2004, 2007
- Søren Larsen – Djurgården – 2004–2005
- **Tobias Lauritsen** – **Kalmar** – 2026–
- Rasmus Lauritsen – Norrköping – 2019–2020
- Jacob Barrett Laursen – Häcken – 2023–2025
- **Victor Lind** – Norrköping, Brommapojkarna, **Hammarby** – 2023, 2025–
- **Marcus Lindberg** – **Sirius** – 2024–
- Anders Lindegaard – Helsingborg – 2019–2020, 2022
- Marco Lund – Norrköping – 2021–23
- Lasse Madsen – Häcken – 2025
- Thomas Madsen – Örgryte – 1993
- Marcus Mathisen – Halmstad, Falkenberg, Sirius – 2017, 2019–2023
- Thomas Mikkelsen – IFK Göteborg – 2015
- Tobias Mikkelsen – Helsingborg – 2019
- **Sanders Ngabo** – **Häcken** – 2025–
- Brian Steen Nielsen – Malmö FF – 2001–2002
- Lasse Nielsen – Malmö FF – 2017–2023
- Lasse Nielsen – Trelleborg – 2018
- **Max Nielsen** – **Mjällby** – 2026–
- Ole Nielsen – Västerås – 1978
- **Emeka Nnamani** – **Kalmar** – 2026–
- Peter Nymann – Djurgården – 2012–2013
- **Jeppe Okkels** – Elfsborg, **Djurgården** – 2020–2023, 2025–
- Allan Olesen – Åtvidaberg – 2012–2014
- Kim Olsen – Örebro – 2008–2010
- David Ousted – Hammarby – 2020–2021
- Bjørn Paulsen – Hammarby – 2017–2018, 2021–2022
- Marc Pedersen – Djurgården – 2012–2013
- Flemming Pehrson – Mjällby – 1980, 1985
- Ronny Petersen – Trelleborg – 2001
- August Priske – Djurgården – 2024–2025
- Andreas Pyndt – IFK Göteborg, Sirius – 2024–2025
- Mileta Rajović – Kalmar – 2023
- Anders Randrup – Elfsborg, Helsingborg – 2016–2017, 2019–2020
- Kenneth Rasmussen – Helsingborg – 2002–2004
- Martin Rauschenberg – Gefle, Brommapojkarna – 2015–2016, 2018
- Allan Ravn – Landskrona – 2003
- Phillip Rejnhold – Helsingborg – 2022
- Søren Rieks – IFK Göteborg, Malmö FF – 2014–2024
- **Casper Risbjerg** – **Västerås** – 2026–
- Mads Roerslev – Halmstad – 2017
- André Rømer – Elfsborg – 2021–2023
- Nicklas Røjkjær – Mjällby – 2024–2025
- **Mikkel Rygaard** – **Häcken** – 2022–
- Yousef Salech – Sirius – 2024
- Thomas Santos – IFK Göteborg – 2023–2025
- Per Sefort – Landskrona – 1994
- Olcay Senoglu – Trelleborg – 2007–2008
- **Alexander Simmelhack** – **IFK Göteborg** – 2026–
- Laurs Skjellerup – IFK Göteborg – 2024
- Andreas Skovgaard – Örebro – 2020–2021
- Martin Spelmann – Mjällby – 2020
- **Jens Stryger** – **Malmö FF** – 2024–
- Kevin Stuhr Ellegaard – Elfsborg – 2012–2019
- Harald Sørensen – Häcken – 1983
- Sebastian Svärd – Syrianska – 2013
- **Arman Taranis** – **Degerfors** – 2025–
- Peter Therkildsen – Djurgården – 2024
- Jens Jakob Thomasen – Elfsborg – 2023–2025
- **Mads Døhr Thychosen** – **AIK** – 2023–
- Stig Tøfting – Häcken – 2005
- Viktor Tranberg – Örebro – 2018
- Christian Traoré – Hammarby – 2002, 2007–2009
- Jacob Trenskow – Kalmar – 2023–2024
- **Andreas Troelsen** – **Brommapojkarna** – 2026–
- Jeppe Vestergaard – Malmö FF – 2002–2003
- Lasse Vibe – IFK Göteborg – 2013–2015, 2019
- Ulrich Vinzents – Malmö FF – 2006–2012
- **Frederik Winther** – **Hammarby** – 2024–
- Magnus Wørts – Mjällby – 2021–2022
- Kenneth Zohore – IFK Göteborg – 2014

=== DR Congo ===
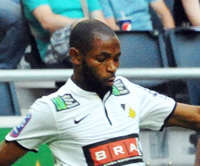
René Makondele has played 273 Allsvenskan matches for Djurgården, Gefle, Helsingborg and Häcken.

- Yannick Bapupa – Djurgården, Gefle – 2002–2004, 2006–2009
- Richard Ekunde – GAIS – 2006–2012
- René Makondele – Djurgården, Gefle, Helsingborg, Häcken – 2002–2016
- Nzuzi Toko – IFK Göteborg – 2019–2020

=== Egypt ===
- Faithem Abolew – Helsingborg – 1997
- Alexander Jakobsen – Falkenberg, Norrköping, Kalmar – 2015–2019

=== England ===
- **Abdul Abdulmalik** – **Djurgården** – 2026–
- John Allen – Malmö FF, V:a Frölunda – 1989
- Kenny Allen – Halmstad – 1983
- Hakeem Araba – Falkenberg – 2015–2016
- Calum Angus – GAIS – 2009–2012
- Dave Bamber – Trelleborg – 1985
- Eddie Blackburn – Halmstad – 1987
- Lee Boylan – Trelleborg – 1999
- Shaun Close – Halmstad – 1986
- Charlie Colkett – Östersund – 2019–2021
- Terry Curran – Åtvidaberg – 1980
- Alan Dodd – GAIS – 1988
- Curtis Edwards – Östersund, Djurgården – 2016–2021
- **Jonathan Esenga** – **Elfsborg** – 2026–
- Justin Fashanu – Trelleborg – 1993
- Andrew Fox – AFC Eskilstuna – 2017
- Steve Galloway – Djurgården, Umeå – 1988–1989, 1996
- Steve Gardner – IFK Göteborg, GAIS – 1983–1984, 1988
- Stuart Garnham – Djurgården – 1981
- Colin Hill – Trelleborg – 1997
- Jamie Hopcutt – Östersund – 2016–2019
- Brian Hornsby – Brage – 1984–1985
- Graham Howell – Västerås – 1978
- Simon Hunt – Elfsborg, Brage – 1984, 1986–1987
- Francis Jno-Baptiste – Östersund – 2019–2021
- James Keene – GAIS, Elfsborg, Djurgården, Halmstad – 2006–2013, 2015
- Andrew Kelly – Landskrona – 2005
- Billy Lansdowne – Kalmar – 1984–1986
- Gary Locke – Halmstad – 1986
- Brian McDermott – Norrköping, Djurgården – 1984, 1986
- Malcolm Macdonald – Djurgården – 1979
- Paul McKinnon – Malmö FF – 1980–1981
- Trevor Matthewson – Örgryte – 1988
- Jernade Meade – AFC Eskilstuna – 2017
- Andrew Mills – Östersund – 2020
- David Mogg – Åtvidaberg – 1981
- Ravel Morrison – Östersund – 2019
- Mike Newson – Öster – 1995
- **David Obou** – **Örgryte** – 2026–
- Gary Owen – Hammarby – 1988
- **Michael Parker** – **Örgryte** – 2026–
- Tim Parkin – Malmö FF – 1980–1981
- George Parris – Norrköping – 1995
- Kyle Patterson – GAIS – 2010
- Kenny Pavey – AIK, Öster – 2006–2011, 2013–2015
- Ronald Powell – Brynäs – 1974
- Alex Purver – Östersund – 2019–2020
- **Charles Sagoe Jr** – **Kalmar** – 2026–
- Lloyd Saxton – GIF Sundsvall – 2015, 2019
- Jerell Sellars – Östersund – 2018–2021
- Carl Shutt – Malmö FF – 1990
- Mike Small – Häcken – 1994
- Alfie Whiteman – Degerfors – 2021–2022
- Steve Whitton – Halmstad – 1990
- John Wilkinson – AIK – 1978–1979
- Gary Williams – Djurgården – 1978–1980, 1986
- David Wilson – Ljungskile – 1997
- Frank Worthington – Mjällby – 1980

=== Eritrea ===
- Henok Goitom – AIK – 2012–2015, 2017–2021
- **Nahom Netabay** – Kalmar, Sirius, **Degerfors** – 2020–2023, 2025–
- Mohammed Saeid – Örebro, Sirius – 2012–2014, 2018–2021
- **Tesfaldet Tekie** – Norrköping, Östersund, **Hammarby** – 2015–2016, 2018–2019, 2023–

=== Estonia ===
- Henri Anier – Kalmar – 2016
- Vitali Gussev – Trelleborg – 2004
- **Matvei Igonen** – **Degerfors** – 2025–
- Marko Kristal – Elfsborg – 1999
- Siim Luts – Norrköping – 2013
- Karol Mets – AIK – 2019–2020
- Tarmo Neemelo – Helsingborg – 2006
- Erik Sorga – IFK Göteborg – 2022
- Joonas Tamm – Norrköping – 2011–2013
- Ingemar Teever – Öster – 2006
- **Erko Jonne Tõugjas** – **Halmstad** – 2026–
- Andreas Vaikla – Norrköping – 2016
- Martin Vetkal – Brommapojkarna – 2024–2025
- Kristen Viikmäe – Gefle – 2006
- Indrek Zelinski – Landskrona – 2003

=== Ethiopia ===
- Walid Atta – AIK, Helsingborg, Häcken, Östersund – 2008–2010, 2012–2014, 2016
- Yussuf Saleh – AIK, Syrianska – 2008–2009, 2011–2012

=== Faroe Islands ===
- **Martin Agnarsson** – **Mjällby** – 2026–
- Viljormur Davidsen – Helsingborg – 2022
- **Mattias Hellisdal** – **Västerås** – 2026–
- Brandur Hendriksson – Helsingborg – 2020
- **Áki Samuelsen** – **Mjällby** – 2026–

=== Finland ===
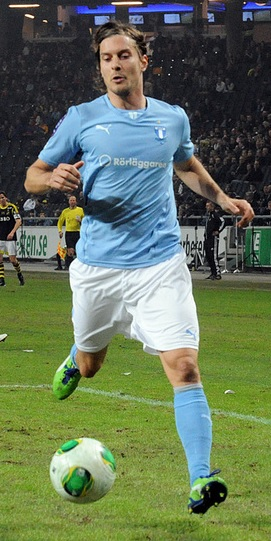
Markus Halsti has played 112 Allsvenskan matches for Malmö FF.

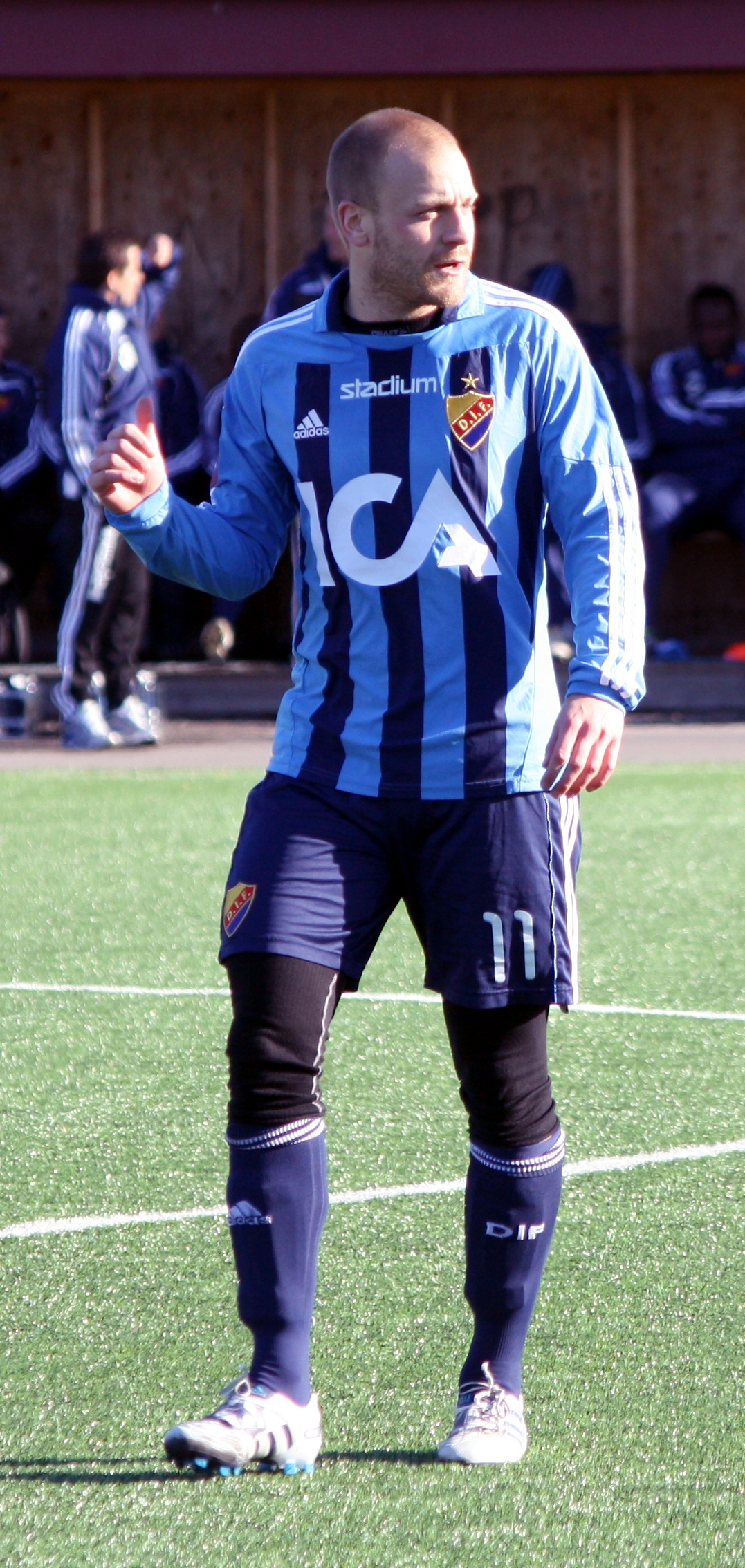
Daniel Sjölund has played 253 Allsvenskan matches for Djurgården and Åtvidaberg.

- Denis Abdulahi – Örebro – 2010–2011
- Pertti Alaja – Malmö FF – 1982–1983
- Jarmo Alatensiö – Brage – 1988–1989
- Nikolai Alho – Halmstad – 2017–
- Paulus Arajuuri – Kalmar – 2010–2013
- Kari Arkivuo – Häcken – 2010–2019
- Magnus Bahne – Halmstad – 2007–2009
- Lucas Bergström – Brommapojkarna – 2024
- Anders Eriksson – Öster – 1996–1997
- Carljohan Eriksson – Mjällby – 2020–2021
- Jari Europaeus – Gefle, Öster – 1984, 1987–1988
- Petteri Forsell – Örebro – 2017
- Mikael Granskog – Norrköping – 1981–1982, 1984–1986
- Albin Granlund – Örebro – 2018–2020
- Tommi Grönlund – Ljungskile, Trelleborg, Helsingborg – 1997–2003
- **Santeri Haarala** – Djurgården, **Degerfors** – 2024–
- Markus Halsti – Malmö FF – 2008–2014
- Kasper Hämäläinen – Djurgården – 2010–2012
- **Altti Hellemaa** – **Elfsborg** – 2025–
- Janne Hietanen – Norrköping – 1998
- Erik Holmgren – GAIS – 1988–1992
- Hampus Holmgren – Åtvidaberg – 2015
- Jari Hudd – AIK – 1987–1989
- Jukka Ikäläinen – Örgryte – 1981–1985
- Jari Ilola – Elfsborg – 2003–2010
- Jonatan Johansson – Malmö FF – 2006–2008
- **Rony Jansson** – **Kalmar** – 2023–2024, 2026–
- Miika Juntunen – Örgryte – 1986
- Tom Källström – AIK – 1976–1978
- Rasmus Karjalainen – Örebro, Helsingborg – 2020, 2022
- Hugo Keto – Värnamo – 2025
- Christoffer Kloo – Öster – 1996–1998
- Ulf Kortesniemi – Ljungskile – 1997
- Sampo Koskinen – IFK Göteborg – 2003
- Mika Kottila – Trelleborg – 2000–2001
- Toni Kuivasto – Djurgården – 2003–2009
- Pekka Kultanen – IFK Sundsvall – 1979
- **Otso Liimatta** – Värnamo, Halmstad, **Sirius** – 2025–
- Peter Lindholm – IFK Sundsvall – 1981
- Stefan Lindström – IFK Sundsvall – 1981
- Lucas Lingman – Helsingborg – 2022
- Jari Litmanen – Malmö FF – 2005–2006
- Ismo Lius – Örgryte – 1990
- Jani Lyyski – Djurgården – 2010–2011
- Tomi Maanoja – AIK – 2008–2010
- **Niilo Mäenpää** – **Halmstad** – 2024–
- Eero Markkanen – AIK, Dalkurd – 2014, 2016–2018
- Pauli Matikainen – Brynäs – 1974
- Lasse Mattila – Ljungskile – 1997
- Pekka Mattila – GIF Sundsvall – 1989
- Kai Meriluoto – Värnamo – 2025
- **Tony Miettinen** – **Mjällby** – 2025–
- Niklas Moisander – Malmö FF – 2021–2024
- Jyrki Nieminen – AIK – 1979, 1981–1984
- Jari Niinimäki – AIK – 1986
- Fredrik Nordback – Örebro – 1997–2004, 2007–2011
- Thomas Nordström – Örebro – 1990
- Jussi Nuorela – Malmö FF – 2002–2003
- Mika Nurmela – Malmö FF – 1993–1995
- Janne Oinas – Örebro – 1995
- Juhani Ojala – Häcken – 2017–2019
- Mika Ojala – Häcken – 2013
- Antti Okkonen – Landskrona – 2004–2005
- **Anthony Olusanya** – **Kalmar** – 2026–
- Hannu Patronen – Helsingborg – 2008–2011
- Esa Pekonen – AIK – 1987–1989
- Akseli Pelvas – Falkemberg – 2016
- Joel Perovuo – Djurgården – 2010–2011
- Erkka Petäjä – Öster, Malmö FF – 1985–1988, 1990–1993
- **Juhani Pikkarainen** – **Degerfors** – 2025–
- Juho Pirttijoki – Sundsvall – 2017–2018
- Antti Pohja – Hammarby – 2002–2003
- Roni Porokara – Örebro – 2008–2010
- Jens Portin – Gefle – 2010–2016
- Jari Poutiainen – Hammarby – 1990
- Jari Rantanen – IFK Göteborg – 1986–1987
- Rami Rantanen – Trelleborg – 1995–1997
- Aki Riihilahti – Djurgården – 2007–2008
- Patrik Rikama-Hinnenberg – GIF Sundsvall – 2012
- Riku Riski – Örebro, IFK Göteborg – 2011, 2015
- Paulus Roiha – Åtvidaberg – 2010
- Anders Roth – Örgryte – 1987–1990
- Janne Saarinen – IFK Göteborg, Häcken – 1997, 2009
- Jarmo Saastamoinen – AIK – 1995
- Mika Sankala – GIF Sundsvall – 1987–1989
- Jani Sarajärvi – Norrköping – 2002
- Jukka Sauso – Örgryte – 2005–2006
- Henri Scheweleff – Örgryte – 2005–2006
- Rasmus Schüller – Häcken, Djurgården – 2016, 2021–2025
- Henri Sillanpää – GAIS – 2010–2012
- **Matias Siltanen** – **Djurgården** – 2025–
- Daniel Sjölund – Djurgården, Åtvidaberg, Norrköping – 2003–2018
- Simon Skrabb – Åtvidaberg, Gefle, Norrköping, Kalmar – 2014–2019, 2022–2024
- **Marius Söderbäck** – **Kalmar** – 2026–
- Tim Sparv – Halmstad – 2007–2009
- **Adam Ståhl** – Dalkurd, Sirius, Mjällby, **Djurgården** – 2018–
- **Timo Stavitski** – **Mjällby** – 2024–
- Anssi Suhonen – Öster – 2025
- Antti Sumiala – Norrköping – 2002
- Kim Suominen – Norrköping – 1996–1997
- **Adrian Svanbäck** – **Häcken** – 2025–
- Fredrik Svanbäck – Helsingborg – 2004–2009
- Matias Tamminen – Öster – 2025
- Robert Taylor – AIK – 2017
- **Miro Tenho** – **Djurgården** – 2024–
- Robin Tihi – AIK, Värnamo – 2020, 2022–2023
- Joona Toivio – Djurgården, Häcken – 2010–2012, 2018–2021
- **Diogo Tomás** – **AIK** – 2026–
- Markus Törnvall – Norrköping – 1989
- Marko Tuomela – GIF Sundsvall – 2001–2002
- Jasse Tuominen – Häcken – 2020–2021
- Tuomo Turunen – IFK Göteborg, Trelleborg – 2009–2011
- Jere Uronen – Helsingborg, AIK – 2012–2015, 2025
- Pekka Utriainen – Holmsund – 1967
- Peter Utriainen – Öster, Gefle – 1980–1984
- Tuomas Uusimäki – Häcken, Örgryte – 2001, 2005–2006
- **Leo Väisänen** – Elfsborg, **Häcken** – 2020–2022, 2025–
- Sauli Väisänen – AIK – 2014–2017
- Onni Valakari – AIK – 2024–
- Tatu Varmanen – Öster – 2025
- Vesa Vasara – Kalmar – 2002
- Isak Vidjeskog – Kalmar – 2021
- Walter Viitala – Malmö FF – 2018
- Kari Virtanen – AIK – 1983–1985
- Ville Viljanen – Häcken, V:a Frölunda – 1998–1999
- **Leo Walta** – Mjällby, **Sirius** – 2023–
- Robin Wikman – Landskrona, Häcken – 2005, 2009
- Tommy Wirtanen – Örebro – 2009–2012
- Saku Ylätupa – AIK, GIF Sundsvall, Kalmar – 2019–2024
- **Miska Ylitolva** – **Kalmar** – 2026–

=== France ===
- Bobby Allain – Örebro – 2021
- Grégoire Amiot – Falkenberg – 2020
- **Rocco Ascone** – **Halmstad** – 2025–
- Ibrahim Ba – Djurgården – 2005
- Younes Bnou Marzouk – Dalkurd FF – 2018
- **Karim Boutera** – **Degerfors** – 2026–
- **Ladji Camara** – **AIK** – 2026–
- Yassine El Ouatki – Varberg – 2023
- Mamadou Fofana – Syrianska – 2011
- Léandre Griffit – Elfsborg – 2006–2007
- Ivan Inzoudine – Kalmar – 2024
- Joshua Nadeau – Gefle – 2016
- Damien Plessis – Örebro – 2017
- Mahamé Siby – Malmö FF – 2022–2023
- Arthur Sorin – Kalmar – 2007–2008

=== Gabon ===
- **Serge-Junior Martinsson Ngouali** – **Brommapojkarna**, Hammarby – 2010, 2013–2014, 2017–2020, 2024–

=== Gambia ===
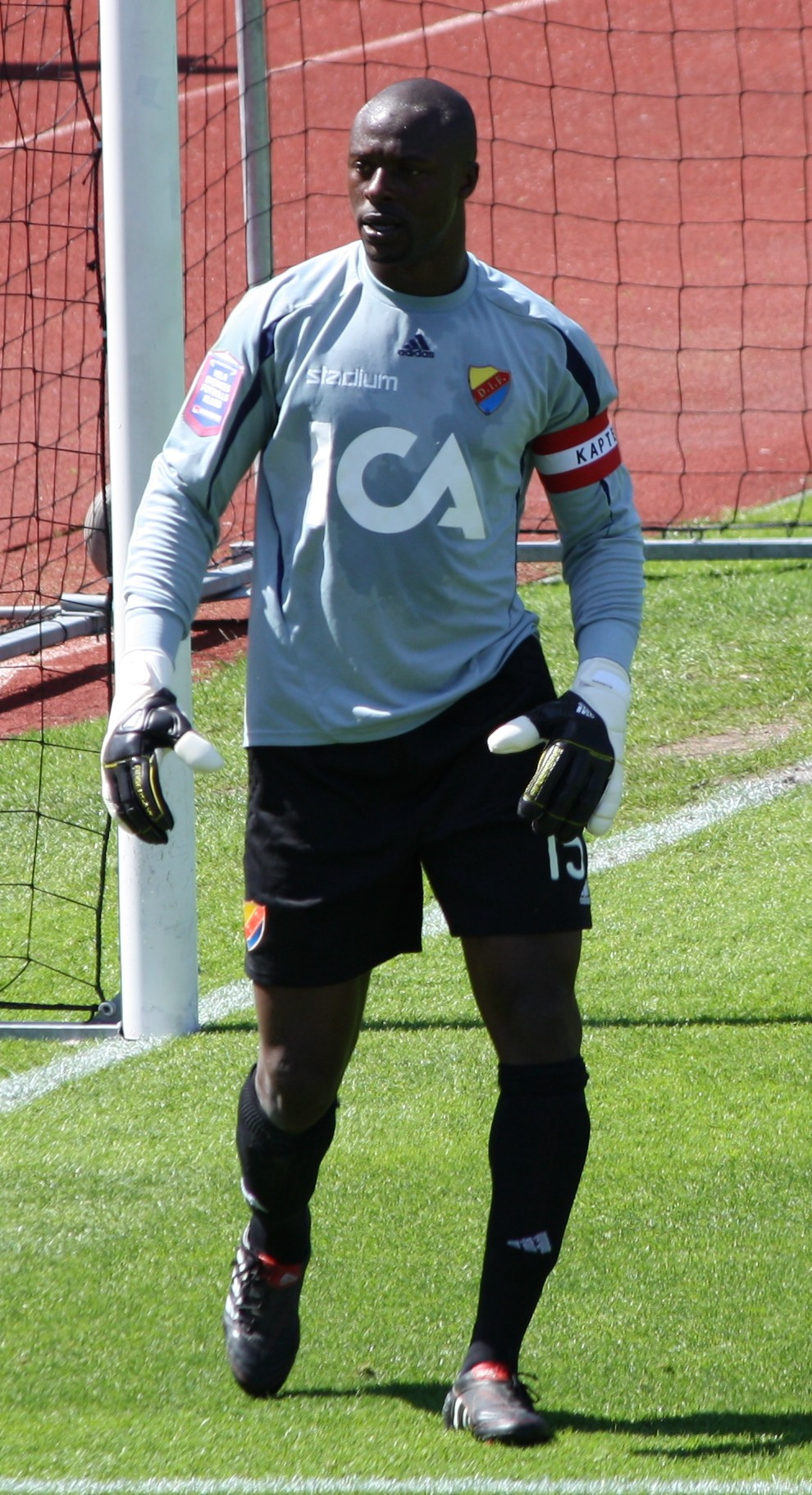
Pa Dembo Touray has played 194 Allsvenskan matches for Djurgården.

- Modou Barrow – Norrköping – 2012
- Jesper Ceesay – AIK, Norrköping – 2022–2025
- Joseph Colley – Sirius – 2021
- Kebba Ceesay – Djurgården, Dalkurd, Sirius, Helsingborg – 2007–2012, 2016, 2018–2020
- Omar Colley – Djurgården – 2015–2016
- Pa Dibba – GIF Sundsvall, Hammarby – 2012, 2015–2018
- Maudo Jarjué – Elfsborg – 2021–2023
- **Suwaibou Kebbeh** – **Hammarby** – 2026–
- **Abdoulie Manneh** – **Mjällby** – 2024–
- Aziz Corr Nyang – Djurgården – 2002–2004
- Njogu Demba-Nyrén – Häcken – 2000–2001
- Omar Jawo – Gefle, Syrianska – 2009–2012
- Youssoupha Sanyang – Västerås, Öster – 2024–25
- Demba Savage – Häcken – 2016–
- Noah Sonko Sundberg – AIK, GIF Sundsvall, Östersund – 2014–2021
- Alagie Sosseh – Hammarby – 2007–2008
- Pa Dembo Touray – Djurgården – 2004–2011
- Bubacarr Trawally – Hammarby – 2022–2023

=== Georgia ===
- Soso Chedia – GIF Sundsvall – 1991
- Giorgi Kharaishvili – IFK Göteborg – 2018–2020
- Saba Mamatsashvili – Sirius – 2024–2025
- Kakhaber Tskhadadze – GIF Sundsvall – 1991
- Zurab Tsiskaridze – AFC Eskilstuna – 2017

=== Germany ===
- Dieter Burdenski – AIK – 1988
- Christian Demirtaş – Syrianska – 2012–2013
- Lukas Grill – Mjällby – 2014
- Michael Görlitz – Halmstad – 2008–2011
- Michael Martin – Sirius – 2024
- Jan Tauer – Djurgården – 2007–2009
- **Tom Trybull** – **Halmstad** – 2026–
- Volker Tönsfeldt – Djurgården – 1980–1981

=== Ghana ===
- Jalal Abdullai – Elfsborg – 2023–2024
- Zakaria Abdullai – Gefle – 2011–2013
- Malik Abubakari – Malmö FF – 2021–2022
- Mohammed Abubakari – Åtvidaberg, Häcken Helsingborg – 2012–2017, 2019–2020
- David Accam – Helsingborg, Hammarby – 2012–2014, 2021
- Joachim Acheampong – Norrköping – 1994–1995
- Benjamin Acquah – Helsingborg – 2022
- Abdul-Basit Adam – Gefle – 2016
- **Frank Adjei** – Värnamo, **Hammarby** – 2023–
- Nathaniel Adjei – Hammarby – 2022–2023
- Enoch Kofi Adu – Malmö FF, AIK, Mjällby – 2014–2016, 2018–2022
- Joachim Adukor – Gefle – 2012–2013
- Joseph Aidoo – Hammarby – 2015–2017
- Ezekiel Alladoh – Brommapojkarna – 2025
- Daniel Amartey – Djurgården – 2013–2014
- Joseph Amoako – Helsingborg – 2022
- Michael Anaba – AFC Eskilstuna – 2019
- Frank Arhin – Östersund – 2017–2018, 2020–2021
- **Isaac Assibu** – **Malmö FF** – 2026–
- **Blessing Asumang** – **GAIS** – 2026–
- Ibrahim Atiku – Assyriska – 2005
- Reuben Ayarna – GAIS – 2009–2012
- Michael Baidoo – Elfsborg – 2022–2024
- Thomas Boakye – Halmstad – 2021, 2023–2024
- Derek Boateng – AIK – 2003–2004, 2006
- Ema Boateng – Helsingborg – 2013–2015
- Emmanuel Boateng – Elfsborg – 2021–2023
- Stephen Bolma – Norrköping – 2023–2024
- Kwame Bonsu – Mjällby, Gefle – 2014–2016
- **Evans Botchway** – **Brommapojkarna** – 2024, 2026–
- Yussif Chibsah – Gefle, Djurgården – 2008–2014
- Afo Dodoo – Landskrona – 2002–2003
- Emmanuel Dogbe – Åtvidaberg – 2013–2014
- Godsway Donyoh – Djurgården, Falkenberg – 2013–2015
- Benjamin Fadi – Malmö FF – 2013
- Emmanuel Frimpong – AFC Eskilstuna – 2017
- **Yiriyon Gideon** – **Degerfors** – 2026–
- Kingsley Gyamfi – Hammarby, Öster – 2024–2025
- King Gyan – Halmstad – 2014–2015
- Abdul Halik Hudu – Hammarby – 2021
- Kwame Karikari – AIK, Halmstad – 2011–2015
- Sadat Karim – Halmstad – 2021
- Prosper Kasim – IFK Göteborg – 2016
- Richard Kingson – Hammarby – 2007
- Kwame Kizito – Häcken, Falkenberg – 2019–2020
- Gershon Koffie – Hammarby – 2017–2018
- Patrick Kpozo – AIK, Östersund – 2016–2018, 2021
- Enock Kwakwa – Falkenberg – 2015–2016
- Abdul Majeed Waris – Häcken – 2010–2012
- Gideon Mensah – Varberg – 2020–2023
- Michael Mensah – Trelleborg – 2007–2008
- Richard Oteng Mensah – Malmö FF – 2001
- Baba Mensah – Häcken – 2016
- Samuel Mensiro – Örebro, Östersund – 2014–2021
- Issa Mohammed – Norrköping – 2002
- Naeem Mohammed – Halmstad – 2023–2025
- Nasiru Mohammed – Häcken – 2012–2019, 2021
- **Rufai Mohammed** – Värnamo, **Elfsborg** – 2025–
- Ibrahim Moro – AIK – 2012–2014
- **Nasiru Moro** – Örebro, **Degerfors** – 2021, 2025–
- Divine Naah – Örebro – 2017
- Ebenezer Ofori – AIK – 2013–2016, 2020–2021
- Phil Ofosu-Ayeh – Halmstad – 2021, 2023–2024
- Lord Ofosuhene – Falkenberg – 2016
- Mike Owusu – Malmö, Örgryte, Trelleborg – 1997–2001, 2004–2005
- Kojo Peprah Oppong – Norrköping – 2023, 2025
- Yaw Preko – Halmstad – 2004–2005
- Kwame Quansah – AIK – 2003–2004
- Shamo Quaye – Umeå – 1996
- Lawson Sabah – IFK Göteborg – 2016–2017
- Ibrahim Sadiq – Häcken – 2022–2023
- **Ziyad Salifu** – **Degerfors** – 2025–
- Charles Sampson – Assyriska – 2005
- Kingsley Sarfo – Sirius, Malmö FF – 2017
- **Issaka Seidu** – **IFK Göteborg** – 2026–
- Emmanuel Tetteh – IFK Göteborg – 1997–1999
- **Emmanuel Yeboah** – **Halmstad** – 2025–
- **Rockson Yeboah** – **IFK Göteborg** – 2024–
- Terry Yegbe – Elfsborg – 2024–2025

=== Greece ===
- **Christos Almyras** – **Djurgården** – 2026–
- Giannis Anestis – IFK Göteborg – 2019–2021
- Vasilios Martidis – Kalmar – 1982, 1984–1985

=== Guinea ===
- **Issiaga Camara** – **Brommapojkarna** – 2025–
- Ousmane Camara – AFC Eskilstuna – 2019
- Amadou Doumbouya – Djurgården – 2022
- **Mikael Dyrestam** – IFK Göteborg, Kalmar, **Örgryte** – 2009–2013, 2017–2018, 2026–
- **Ibrahima Breze Fofana** – **Hammarby** – 2024–
- Amadou Kalabane – AFC Eskilstuna – 2017
- Aly Keita – Östersund – 2016–2021
- **Madiou Keita** – **Västerås** – 2026–
- Pa Konate – Malmö FF, GIF Sundsvall – 2013–2017, 2019
- **Mohamed Soumah** – **Sirius** – 2026–
- **Salifou Soumah** – **Malmö FF** – 2025–

=== Guinea-Bissau ===
- Lino – Assyriska – 2005
- José Monteiro – Hammarby – 2006–2009

=== Haiti ===
- Ronaldo Damus – GIF Sundsvall – 2022

=== Honduras ===
- Kevin Álvarez – Norrköping – 2019–2021

=== Hungary ===
- **Áron Csongvai** – **AIK** – 2025–
- Balázs Rabóczki – Norrköping – 2002
- Gábor Szántó – Elfsborg – 1987
- **Zalán Vancsa** – **Sirius** – 2026–

=== Iceland ===
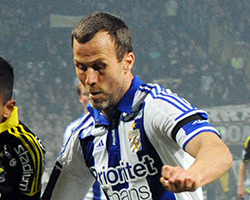
Hjálmar Jónsson has played 228 Allsvenskan matches for IFK Göteborg.

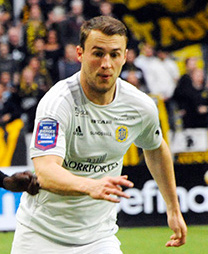
Rúnar Már Sigurjónsson has played 39 Allsvenskan matches for GIF Sundsvall.

- **Mikael Anderson** – **Djurgården** – 2025–
- Jónatan Guðni Arnarsson – Norrköping – 2025
- Kári Árnason – Djurgården, Malmö FF – 2005–2006, 2015–2016
- Guðjón Baldvinsson – GAIS, Halmstad – 2009, 2012–2014
- Andri Baldursson – Elfsborg – 2023–2024
- Adam Ingi Benediktsson – IFK Göteborg – 2021, 2023
- Ísak Bergmann Jóhannesson – Norrköping – 2019–2021
- Hlynur Birgisson – Örebro – 1995–1998
- Andri Rúnar Bjarnason – Helsingborg – 2019
- Aron Bjarnason – Sirius – 2021–2023
- Jóhannes Kristinn Bjarnason – Norrköping – 2021
- Ólafur Örn Bjarnason – Malmö FF – 1998–1999
- Theódór Elmar Bjarnason – IFK Göteborg – 2009–2012
- Halldór Orri Björnsson – Falkenberg – 2014
- Hilmar Björnsson – Helsingborg – 1998–1999
- Helgi Daníelsson – Öster, Elfsborg, AIK – 2006, 2008–2013
- Gísli Eyjólfsson – Halmstad – 2024–2025
- Alfreð Finnbogason – Helsingborg – 2010
- Kristján Flóki Finnbogason – Brommapojkarna – 2018
- Jón Guðni Fjóluson – Sundsvall, Norrköping, Hammarby – 2012, 2015–2018, 2021
- Skúli Jón Friðgeirsson – Elfsborg, Gefle – 2012–2014
- Valgeir Lunddal Friðriksson – Häcken – 2021–2024
- Gunnar Gíslason – Häcken – 1993
- Andri Guðjohnsen – Norrköping – 2022–2023
- Arnór Guðjohnsen – Häcken, Örebro – 1993–1998
- **Daníel Guðjohnsen** – **Malmö FF** – 2023–
- Sveinn Aron Guðjohnsen – Elfsborg – 2021–2023
- Eggert Guðmundsson – Halmstad – 1982–1986
- Eggert Aron Guðmundsson – Elfsborg – 2024
- Jóhann Guðmundsson – Örgryte, GAIS – 2004–2008
- Tryggvi Guðmundsson – Örgryte – 2004
- Brynjar Gunnarsson – Örgryte – 1999
- Guðmundur Reynir Gunnarsson – GAIS – 2009
- Garðar Gunnlaugsson – Norrköping – 2008
- Höskuldur Gunnlaugsson – Halmstad – 2017
- Daníel Hafsteinsson – Helsingborg – 2019
- Emil Hallfreðsson – Malmö FF – 2006
- Tryggvi Hrafn Haraldsson – Halmstad – 2017
- Haukur Heiðar Hauksson – AIK – 2015–2018
- Eyjólfur Héðinsson – GAIS – 2007–2011
- Auðun Helgason – Landskrona – 2003–2004
- **Hjörtur Hermannsson** – **IFK Göteborg** – 2016, 2026–
- Hördur Hilmarsson – AIK – 1981
- Sigurbjörn Örn Hreiðarsson – Trelleborg – 2000
- Birnir Snær Ingason – Halmstad – 2024–2025
- Haraldur Ingólfsson – Elfsborg – 1998–2000
- Hallgrímur Jónasson – GAIS – 2009–2011
- Jakob Jonhardsson – Helsingborg – 1998
- Gunnlaugur Jónsson – Örebro – 1998
- Hjálmar Jónsson – IFK Göteborg – 2002–2016
- Kristinn Jónsson – Brommapojkarna – 2014
- Kristján Jónsson – Elfsborg – 1997
- Pétur Björn Jónsson – Hammarby – 1998
- Sigurður Jónsson – Örebro – 1996–1997
- **Hlynur Freyr Karlsson** – **Brommapojkarna** – 2024–
- Óttar Magnús Karlsson – Trelleborg – 2018
- Viðar Örn Kjartansson – Malmö FF, Hammarby – 2016, 2019
- Birkir Kristinsson – Norrköping – 1998
- Rúnar Kristinsson – Örgryte – 1995–1997
- Ögmundur Kristinsson – Hammarby – 2015–2017
- Guðjón Pétur Lýðsson – Helsingborg – 2011
- **Júlíus Magnússon** – **Elfsborg** – 2025–
- Pétur Marteinsson – Hammarby – 1998, 2003–2006
- Guðmundur Mete – Malmö FF – 2002
- Guðmundur Baldvin Nökkvason – Mjällby – 2023
- Davíð Kristján Ólafsson – Kalmar – 2022–2023
- Thorsteinn Olafsson – IFK Göteborg – 1980
- Elías Már Ómarsson – IFK Göteborg – 2016–2018
- Óli Ómarsson – Sirius – 2022–2023
- Örn Oskarsson – Örgryte – 1980–1981
- Sölvi Ottesen – Djurgården – 2004–2008
- Victor Pálsson – Helsingborg – 2014–2015
- Einar Páll Tómasson – Degerfors – 1993
- Alfons Sampsted – Norrköping – 2017
- Birkir Már Sævarsson – Hammarby – 2015–2017
- Jónas Guðni Sævarsson – Halmstad – 2009–2011
- Eiður Sigurbjörnsson – Örebro – 2011, 2015
- Þorvaldur Makan Sigbjörnsson – Öster – 1998
- Kolbeinn Sigþórsson – AIK, IFK Göteborg – 2019–2021
- **Arnór Sigurðsson** – Norrköping, **Malmö FF** – 2017–2018, 2022–2023, 2025–
- Hannes Sigurðsson – Sundsvall, Mjällby – 2008, 2013
- Kristinn Freyr Sigurðsson – Sundsvall – 2017
- Ragnar Sigurðsson – IFK Göteborg – 2007–2011
- Ísak Andri Sigurgeirsson – Norrköping – 2023–2025
- Kristofer Sigurgeirsson – V:a Frölunda – 1995
- Rúnar Már Sigurjónsson – Sundsvall – 2015–2016
- **Ari Sigurpálsson** – **Elfsborg** – 2025–
- Ari Freyr Skúlason – Häcken, GIF Sundsvall, Norrköping – 2006, 2008, 2012, 2021–2023
- Ólafur Ingi Skúlason – Helsingborg – 2007–2009
- Arnór Smárason – Helsingborg, Hammarby – 2013–2014, 2016–2018
- Árni Stefánsson – Landskrona – 1980
- Hlynur Stefansson – Örebro – 1992–1995
- Kristinn Steindórsson – Halmstad, Sundsvall – 2013–2014, 2016–2017
- Gudmundur Steinsson – Öster – 1982
- Oskar Sverrisson – Häcken, Varberg – 2019–2023
- Sverrir Sverrisson – Malmö FF – 1998–1999
- Atli Sveinn Þórarinsson – Örgryte – 2000–2004
- Guðmundur Þórarinsson – Norrköping – 2017–2019
- **Kolbeinn Þórðarson** – **IFK Göteborg** – 2023–
- Stefán Þórðarson – Öster – 1997–1998
- Teitur Thordarson – Öster – 1978–1981, 1985–1986
- órður Þórðarson – Norrköping – 1999
- Guðmann Þórisson – Mjällby – 2014
- **Róbert Frosti þorkelsson** – **GAIS** – 2025–
- Gunnar Heiðar Þorvaldsson – Halmstad, Norrköping, Häcken – 2004–2006, 2011–2015
- Arnór Ingvi Traustason – Norrköping, Malmö FF – 2014–2016, 2018–2020, 2022–2025
- Hákon Valdimarsson – Elfsborg – 2021–2023
- Hjörtur Logi Valgarðsson – IFK Göteborg, Örebro – 2011–2013, 2015–
- Árni Vilhjálmsson – Jönköping – 2017

=== Italy ===
- Gianluca Curci – AFC Eskilstuna, Hammarby – 2018–2019

=== Iran ===
- Omid Nazari – Malmö FF – 2011
- Saman Ghoddos – Östersund – 2016–2018
- Alireza Haghighi – AFC Eskilstuna – 2017

=== Iraq ===
- Pashang Abdulla – Degerfors – 2023
- Amir Al-Ammari – Halmstad, IFK Göteborg, Mjällby – 2021–2024
- Amin Al-Hamawi – Helsingborg – 2022
- Hussein Ali – Örebro – 2019–2021
- **Danilo Al-Saed** – **Häcken** – 2025–
- André Alsanati – Sirius – 2023–2024
- Alai Ghasem – IFK Göteborg – 2022–2023
- Ghassan Heamed – Assyriska – 2005
- Jiloan Hamad – Malmö FF, Hammarby, Örebro – 2008–2013, 2017–2018, 2021
- Mohanad Jeahze – Brommapojkarna, Mjällby, Hammarby – 2018, 2020–2022
- Yaser Kasim – Örebro – 2019
- **Montader Madjed** – Varberg, **Hammarby** – 2021–
- Amar Muhsin – Helsingborg – 2022
- Brwa Nouri – Östersund – 2016–2018
- Ahmed Qasem – Elfsborg – 2021–2024
- Rebin Sulaka – Brommapojkarna – 2023
- Ahmed Yasin – Örebro, AIK, Häcken, Örebro – 2011–2012, 2014–2021

=== Ireland ===
- Zack Elbouzedi – AIK – 2021–2023
- Anthony Flood – Örebro – 2010
- Pat Walker – Häcken, GIF Sundsvall – 1983, 1987–1989

=== Israel ===
- Yahav Gurfinkel – Norrköping – 2021

=== Ivory Coast ===
- Yannick Adjoumani – Häcken – 2021
- Yannick Agnero – Halmstad – 2024–2025
- Romeo Amane – Häcken – 2022–2024
- **Ibrahim Cissé** – **AIK** – 2026–
- Souleymane Coulibaly – Värnamo – 2025
- **Ibrahim Diabate** – Västerås, **GAIS** – 2024–
- **Abdoulaye Doumbia** – **Häcken** – 2026–
- Adama Fofana – Varberg – 2020–2021
- **Marvin Illary** – **Halmstad** – 2025–
- Luc Kassi – Degerfors – 2024–2025
- Aboubakar Keita – Halmstad – 2017
- **Sourou Koné** – **Hammarby** – 2026–
- Raoul Kouakou – Malmö FF – 2005–2006
- **Axel Kouame** – **AIK** – 2026–
- Odilon Kossounou – Hammarby – 2019
- Bayéré Junior Loué – Hammarby – 2021
- **Severin Nioule** – **Häcken** – 2024–
- Kalpi Ouattara – Östersund – 2019–2021
- Aziz Ouattara Mohammed – Hammarby – 2021
- Abdul Razak – IFK Göteborg, AFC Eskilstuna, Sirius – 2017–2019
- Abundance Salaou – IFK Göteborg – 2022–2023
- **Axel Taonsa** – **Västerås** – 2026–
- Bazoumana Touré – Hammarby – 2024
- Bénie Traoré – Häcken – 2021, 2023
- **Christ Wawa** – **Häcken** – 2026–

=== Jamaica ===
- Teafore Bennett – Öster – 2006
- Dwayne Miller – Syrianska – 2011–2013
- Ravel Morrison – Östersund – 2019
- Michael Seaton – Örebro – 2015
- Luton Shelton – Helsingborg – 2006–2007
- Khari Stephenson – GAIS, AIK – 2006–2008
- Blair Turgott – Östersund, Häcken, Halmstad – 2019–2022, 2024–2025

=== Japan ===
- Kosuke Kinoshita – Halmstad – 2017
- Keita Kosugi – Djurgården – 2024–2025
- Yukiya Sugita – Dalkurd, Sirius – 2018, 2020–2022
- Soya Takahashi – AFC Eskilstuna – 2019

=== Jordan ===
- Jonathan Tamimi – Jönköping, GIF Sundsvall, Mjällby, Degerfors – 2016–2021

=== Kazakhstan ===
- David Loriya – Halmstad – 2007

=== Kenya ===
- Henry Atola – AIK – 2022
- Collins Sichenje – AIK – 2022
- Robert Mambo Mumba – Örebro, Häcken, GIF Sundsvall – 2004, 2006, 2008
- McDonald Mariga – Helsingborg – 2006–2008
- Bonaventure Maruti – Örebro – 2001–2003
- David Ochieng – Brommapojkarna – 2018
- Joseph Okumu – Elfsborg – 2019–2021
- Michael Olunga – Djurgården – 2016
- Eric Johana Omondi – Brommapojkarna – 2018
- Patrick Osiako – Mjällby – 2010–2011
- Eric Otieno – AIK – 2020–2023
- Timothy Ouma – Elfsborg – 2022–2024
- Paul Oyuga – Örebro – 2001–2003
- **Stanley Wilson** – **AIK** – 2024, 2026–

=== Kosovo ===
- Bajram Ajeti – Brommapojkarna – 2018
- Fidan Aliti – Kalmar – 2019–2020
- Ilir Berisha – Örebro, Gefle – 2012, 2014–2015
- **Bersant Celina** – **AIK** – 2023–
- Ibrahim Drešević – Elfsborg – 2016–2018
- Erton Fejzullahu – Mjällby, Djurgården, Kalmar – 2011–2014, 2017–2018
- Ardian Gashi – Helsingborg – 2010–2014
- Jetmir Haliti – AIK, Mjällby – 2021–2023
- Shpëtim Hasani – Kalmar, Norrköping, Örebro, GIF Sundsvall – 2006, 2011–2012, 2014–2016
- **Dion Krasniqi** – Varberg, **Elfsborg**, Kalmar – 2022–2024, 2026–
- **Ismet Lushaku** – AFC Eskilstuna, Varberg, Norrköping, **Västerås** – 2019, 2022–
- Kushtrim Lushtaku – Örebro – 2011–2012
- Argjend Miftari – Mjällby – 2023, 2025
- Leonard Pllana – Dalkurd – 2018
- Anel Rashkaj – Halmstad, AFC Eskilstuna – 2007–2011, 2017, 2019
- Dardan Rexhepi – Malmö FF, Brommapojkarna, Häcken – 2010–2016
- Erion Sadiku – Varberg – 2020
- Loret Sadiku – Helsingborg, Hammarby – 2012–2014, 2022–2023
- Patriot Sejdiu – Malmö FF, Öster – 2022–2023, 2025
- Astrit Selmani – Varberg, Hammarby – 2020–2022
- Edi Sylisufaj – Falkenberg, Sirius – 2016, 2019–2023
- **Arbër Zeneli** – **Elfsborg** – 2014–2015, 2024–

=== Latvia ===
- Kaspars Gorkšs – Öster, Assyriska – 2003, 2005
- Valerij Ivanov – Helsingborg – 1993–1994
- Andrej Linards – Örebro – 1992–1993
- Andrejs Rubins – Öster – 1997

=== Lebanon ===
- Mohammed Ali Khan – Häcken, Halmstad – 2009–2013, 2015
- Abbas Hassan – Elfsborg, Norrköping – 2005, 2007, 2011–2016
- Felix Michel Melki – Syrianska, AFC Eskilstuna, AIK – 2013, 2019–2020
- Mohamed Ramadan – Helsingborg – 2011, 2015

=== Liberia ===
- Jimmy Dixon – Häcken, Malmö FF – 2005–2009, 2012
- Emmanuel Gono – AIK – 2024
- Dulee Johnson – Häcken, AIK – 2001–2010
- Sam Johnson – Djurgården, Mjällby – 2015–2016, 2021
- Amadaiya Rennie – Elfsborg, GAIS, Hammarby – 2010–2011, 2015–2016
- Justin Salmon – Degerfors – 2021–2023
- Divine Teah – Hammarby – 2024
- Dioh Williams – Häcken, Gefle – 2005–2006, 2011–2016
- Peter Wilson – GIF Sundsvall – 2015–2019

=== Libya ===
- **Mohamed Bawa** – **GAIS** – 2026–

=== Lithuania ===
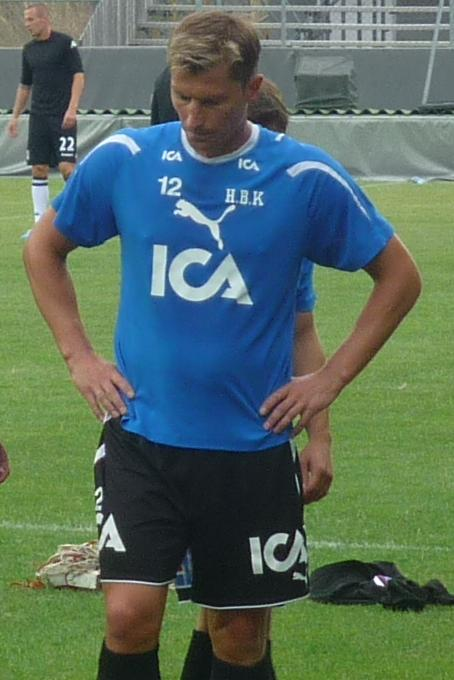
Tomas Žvirgždauskas has played 211 Allsvenskan matches for Halmstad.

- Vytautas Andriuškevičius – Djurgården – 2013–2014
- **Oskar Pukelis** – **AIK** – 2026–
- Tomas Ražanauskas – Malmö FF, Trelleborg – 1999, 2004
- Donatas Vencevičius – GIF Sundsvall – 2005
- Tomas Žvirgždauskas – Halmstad – 2002–2011

=== Luxembourg ===
- Lars Gerson – Norrköping, GIF Sundsvall – 2012–2020
- Seid Korać – Degerfors – 2023
- Vincent Thill – AIK – 2022–2023

=== Malawi ===
- Russell Mwafulirwa – Norrköping – 2008, 2011

=== Mali ===
- Ismaila Coulibaly – AIK – 2024
- **Mamadouba Diaby** – **Degerfors** – 2025–
- **Ismael Diawara** – Degerfors, Malmö FF, AIK, **Sirius** – 2021–
- Mamadou Kouyaté – AFC Eskilstuna – 2019
- Adama Tamboura – Helsingborg – 2006–2009
- Malick Yalcouyé – IFK Göteborg – 2024

=== Moldova ===
- Igor Armaș – Hammarby – 2009
- Petru Racu – Norrköping – 2008, 2011

=== Montenegro ===
- Dragoljub Brnović – Örgryte – 1993
- Dragan Đukanović – Örebro – 1997–1998
- Viktor Đukanović – Hammarby – 2023–2024
- **Andrej Đurić** – **Malmö FF** – 2025–
- Žarko Dragaš – Degerfors – 1996
- **Sead Hakšabanović** – Halmstad, Norrköping, Djurgården, **Malmö FF** – 2015, 2017, 2019–2022, 2024–
- Dino Islamović – Östersund, Kalmar – 2018–2019, 2024
- Slobodan Marović – Norrköping – 1992–1994
- Duško Radinović – Degerfors – 1993–1997
- Miodrag Radulović – Degerfors – 1996–1997
- Vladimir Rodić – Malmö FF, Hammarby, Öster – 2015–2016, 2018–2021, 2025
- Aleksandar Vlahović – Hammarby – 1994
- Milenko Vukčević – Degerfors – 1993–1997

=== Montserrat ===
- Alex Dyer – Östersund, Elfsborg – 2016–2019

=== Morocco ===
- **Achraf Dari** – **Kalmar** – 2026–
- Driss El-Asmar – Malmö FF, Enköping – 2002–2003
- Moestafa El Kabir – Mjällby, Häcken, Kalmar – 2010–2014, 2018–2019
- Karim Fegrouche – Sirius – 2018
- Yazid Kaïssi – Häcken – 2005–2006

=== Netherlands ===
- Rewan Amin – Dalkurd, Östersund – 2018–2020
- **Nassef Chourak** – **Kalmar** – 2026–
- Othman El Kabir – Djurgården – 2016–2017
- Michiel Hemmen – Häcken – 2015
- Jos Hooiveld – AIK – 2009, 2015–2016
- Rick Kruys – Malmö FF – 2008–2010
- Des Kunst – Varberg – 2021–2022
- Stefan van der Lei – Dalkurd – 2018
- Sander van Looy – Falkenberg – 2020
- **Matthias Nartey** – **Sirius** – 2026–
- Geert den Ouden – Djurgården – 2003–2004
- Melvin Platje – Kalmar – 2014
- Alexander Prent – Halmstad – 2009–2010
- Frank Schinkels – Halmstad – 1981–1982
- Floris Smand – Västerås – 2024
- **Jesper Uneken** – **Sirius** – 2026–
- Niels Vorthoren – Häcken – 2015–2016

=== New Zealand ===
- Francis de Vries – Värnamo – 2022
- Matthew Garbett – Falkenberg – 2020
- Craig Henderson – Mjällby – 2011–2013
- Dan Keat – Falkenberg – 2014–2015
- **Owen Parker-Price** – **Örgryte** – 2026–
- **Kees Sims** – **GAIS** – 2024–

=== Nigeria ===
- Yusuf Abdulazeez – Mjällby – 2022–2023
- Suleiman Abdullahi – IFK Göteborg – 2022–2024
- Mohammed Abdulrahman – GAIS – 2011
- Ishaq Abdulrazak – Norrköping, Häcken, Värnamo – 2020–2025
- Michael Adeyinka – GIF Sundsvall – 2005
- Samuel Adegbenro – Norrköping – 2021
- **Samuel Adindu** – **Sirius** – 2026–
- Chima Akas – Kalmar – 2018–2019
- Yakubu Alfa – Helsingborg – 2009
- **Bidemi Olalekan Amole** – **Brommapojkarna** – 2026–
- Akinkunmi Amoo – Hammarby – 2020–2021
- Kevin Amuneke – Landskrona, Norrköping – 2004–2006, 2008
- Kingsley Amuneke – Landskrona – 2004–2006
- Gbenga Arokoyo – Mjällby, Kalmar – 2012–2014, 2018, 2020
- Jordan Attah Kadiri – Östersund – 2019–2020
- Sam Ayorinde – AIK – 2002–2003
- Fortune Bassey – Degerfors – 2023
- Isaac Boye – Örebro – 2018, 2020
- **Ibrahim Buhari** – **Elfsborg** – 2023–
- Uba Charles – Mjällby – 2025
- Dominic Chatto – Häcken – 2009–2013
- John Chibuike – Häcken, AIK, Falkenberg – 2009–2011, 2016, 2019–2020
- Justice Christopher – Trelleborg – 2004
- Abiola Dauda – Kalmar – 2008–2012
- Chisom Egbuchulam – Häcken – 2017
- Prince Eboagwu – Åtvidaberg – 2008–2012
- Prince Ikpe Ekong – GAIS, Djurgården – 2006–2011
- Godswill Ekpolo – Häcken, Norrköping – 2018–2022
- Obie Etie – Syrianska – 2011
- Dickson Etuhu – AIK – 2015–2016
- Richard Friday – Örebro, GAIS – 2021, 2024
- Bala Garba – GIF Sundsvall – 2003
- Haruna Garba – Djurgården – 2017
- Alhaji Gero – Öster, Östersund, Helsingborg – 2013, 2016–2020
- John Junior Igbarumah – Sirius – 2019
- Kennedy Igboananike – Djurgården, AIK, Örebro, Sirius – 2007, 2010–2014, 2017–2018, 2020
- Peter Ijeh – Malmö FF, IFK Göteborg, Syrianska, GAIS – 2001–2005, 2011–2012
- Bonke Innocent – Malmö FF – 2017–2021
- Monday James – Hammarby – 2009
- Johnbosco Kalu – Värnamo – 2023–2025
- Pascal Kondaponi – Ljungskile – 2008
- Garba Lawal – Elfsborg – 2004
- **Abdussalam Magashy** – Värnamo, AIK, **Kalmar** – 2022–2024 2026–
- Samuel Nnamani – AFC Eskilstuna – 2019
- Silas Nwankwo – Mjällby – 2022–2024
- Chinedu Obasi – AIK, Elfsborg – 2016–2019
- Michael Obiku – Helsingborg – 1994
- Edward Ofere – Malmö FF – 2005–2010
- Henry Offia – Sirius, Västerås – 2018–2019, 2024
- Moses Ogbu – Jönköping, Sirius, Mjällby – 2016–2018, 2020
- **Victor Okeke** – **Elfsborg** – 2026–
- Chidi Omeje – AFC Eskilstuna, GIF Sundsvall – 2017–2019
- Michael Omoh – Östersund, Örebro – 2016–2019
- Vince Osuji – Kalmar – 2024
- John Owoeri – Åtvidaberg, Häcken – 2012–2016
- Nsima Peter – Falkenberg – 2019–2020
- Saidu Salisu – IFK Göteborg – 2022
- Monday Samuel – Östersund, Helsingborg, Varberg – 2016, 2020
- Taye Taiwo – AFC Eskilstuna – 2017
- Franklin Tebo Uchenna – Häcken – 2021–2023
- Akombo Ukeyima – GIF Sundsvall − 2008
- **Zadok Yohanna** – **AIK** – 2025–
- Alhassan Yusuf – IFK Göteborg – 2018–2021

=== North Macedonia ===
- Armend Alimi – Örebro – 2011
- Daniel Ivanovski – Mjällby – 2010–2014
- Zoran Jovanovski – Helsingborg – 1997–1999
- Nikica Klinčarski – V:a Frölunda – 1989
- Daniel Krezic – Varberg, Degerfors – 2020–2022
- David Mitov Nilsson – Norrköping, GIF Sundsvall, Sirius – 2012–2017, 2019, 2021–2025
- Nuri Mustafi – GIF Sundsvall – 2008, 2012
- Erdal Rakip – Malmö FF – 2013–2017, 2019–2023
- Artim Šakiri – Halmstad – 1997–1998
- Jurica Siljanoski – Elfsborg – 2001–2003
- Baskim Sopi – Enköping – 2003
- Vujadin Stanojković – Degerfors, Trelleborg – 1993–1998
- Kire Sterjov – V:a Frölunda – 2000
- Filip Trpchevski – Häcken – 2022–2023
- Leonard Zuta – Häcken, Brommapojkarna – 2012–2015, 2020, 2023–2024

=== Northern Ireland ===
- Colin Hill – Trelleborg – 1997
- David McCreery – GIF Sundsvall – 1989
- Sammy McIlroy – Örgryte – 1986
- Daryl Smylie – Ljungskile, Kalmar, Jönköping – 2008–2010, 2016–2017

=== Norway ===
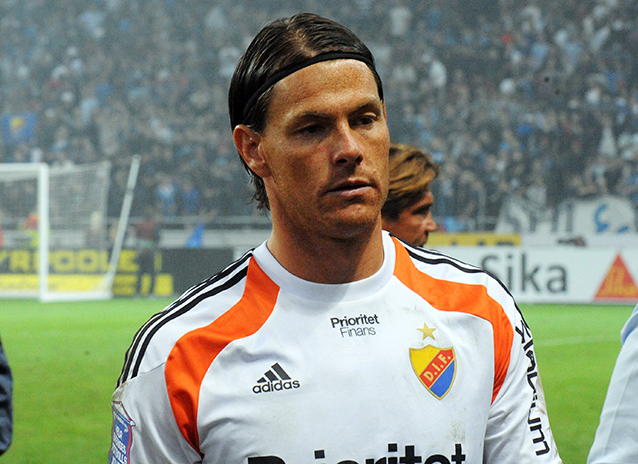
Kenneth Høie has played 84 Allsvenskan matches for Elfsborg and Djurgården.

- Stian Aasmundsen – Jönköping – 2016–2017
- Oscar Aga – Elfsborg – 2022
- Haitam Aleesami – IFK Göteborg – 2015–2016
- Ståle Andersen – Örgryte – 1997–1998
- Vetle Andersen – Halmstad – 1991–1993
- Kent-Are Antonsen – Värnamo – 2025
- Lars Bakkerud – Helsingborg – 2002–2003
- **Bork Bang-Kittilsen** – **Mjällby** – 2025–
- **Oliver Berg** – Dalkurd, GIF Sundsvall, Kalmar, Djurgården, Malmö FF, **Brommapojkarna** – 2018–2019, 2021–
- Tommy Bergersen – GIF Sundsvall – 2002–2005
- Jo Inge Berget – Malmö FF – 2015–2017, 2019–2022
- Lasse Berg Johnsen – Malmö FF – 2023–2025
- Trym Bergman – Hammarby – 2000–2002
- Veton Berisha – Hammarby – 2022
- Daniel Berntsen – Djurgården – 2015–2016
- Henrik Bjørdal – IFK Göteborg – 2017
- **Erik Botheim** – **Malmö FF** – 2024–
- Per Kristian Bråtveit – Djurgården – 2019–2020
- Christian Brink – GIF Sundsvall – 2012
- Fredrik Brustad – AIK – 2015–2016
- Leo Cornic – Djurgården – 2021–2022
- Lars Cramer – Kalmar – 2013–2015
- Thomas Drage – Falkenberg – 2016
- Mathias Dyngeland – Elfsborg – 2020
- **Eskil Edh** – **AIK** – 2024–
- Daniel Eid – Norrköping – 2022–2024
- Magnus Wolff Eikrem – Malmö FF – 2015–2017
- Tarik Elyounoussi – AIK – 2018–2019
- Arne Erlandsen – Djurgården – 1981
- Dinko Felić – Syrianska – 2011–2013
- Karl Oskar Fjørtoft – Hammarby – 2003–2004
- **Erik Flataker** – **AIK** – 2025–
- Aslak Fonn Witry – Djurgården – 2019–2021
- Lars Fuhre – Hammarby – 2015
- Petter Furuseth – Örebro, Hammarby – 2004–2006
- Øyvind Gram – Gefle – 2010
- **Daniel Granli** – AIK, **Elfsborg** – 2019–2020, 2025–
- Mathias Gravem – Ljungskile, Norrköping, GAIS – 1998–2001, 2006
- **Stian Rode Gregersen** – Elfsborg, **Malmö FF** – 2019, 2026–
- Tobias Gulliksen – Djurgården – 2024–2025
- Niklas Gunnarsson – Elfsborg, Djurgården, Norrköping – 2015–2018, 2023
- **Markus Haaland** – **Häcken** – 2026–
- Elias Hagen – IFK Göteborg – 2023
- **Oliver Jordan Hagen** – **Hammarby** – 2026–
- **Sebastian Hansen** – **Mjällby** – 2026–
- Erlend Hanstveit – Helsingborg – 2011–2013
- Eirik Haugan – Östersund – 2019–2021
- Henning Hauger – Elfsborg – 2013–2016
- Torbjørn Heggem – Brommapojkarna – 2023–2024
- **Bo Hegland** – **Djurgården** – 2025–
- **Tobias Heintz** – Häcken, **IFK Göteborg** – 2021, 2025–
- Asbjørn Helgeland – Örebro – 1999–2000
- Sivert Heltne Nilsen – Elfsborg – 2019–2020
- Geir André Herrem – Kalmar – 2019–2020
- **Simen Hestnes** – **Häcken** – 2026–
- Bjørnar Holmvik – Kalmar – 2013
- Jørgen Horn – Elfsborg – 2016–2018
- Tor Øyvind Hovda – Kalmar, Åtvidaberg – 2014–2015
- **Johan Hove** – **AIK** – 2025–
- Kristoffer Hoven – Varberg – 2023
- Even Hovland – Häcken, Brommapojkarna – 2022–2025
- Per-Mathias Høgmo – Norrköping – 1986
- Kenneth Høie – Elfsborg, Djurgården – 2012–2016
- Jon Inge Høiland – IFK Göteborg, Malmö FF – 1999–2007
- Bernt Hulsker – AIK – 2006–2007
- Mikael Ingebrigtsen – IFK Göteborg – 2018
- Kenneth Jensen – Häcken – 1994
- Stig Johansen – Helsingborg – 1998–2000
- Bjørn Johansen – Helsingborg – 2000–2001
- Christian Johnsen – Örebro – 2004
- Joackim Jørgensen – Elfsborg – 2012–2013
- Pa-Modou Kah – AIK – 2003–2004
- Ola Kamara – Häcken – 2023
- Jacob Karlstrøm – IFK Göteborg – 2024
- Aram Khalili – GAIS – 2010
- Thomas Kind Bendiksen – Elfsborg – 2016
- Mike Kjølø – AIK – 1998–1999
- Anders Kristiansen – IFK Göteborg – 2024
- Julian Kristoffersen – Djurgården – 2017
- Snorre Krogsgård – Halmstad – 2015
- Lars Olden Larsen – Häcken – 2022–2024
- **Kristian Lien** – **Djurgården** – 2026–
- André Schei Lindbæk – Landskrona – 2004–2005
- Odd Lindberg – Örebro, IFK Göteborg – 1976–1979
- **Marius Lode** – **Häcken** – 2024–
- Eman Markovic – Norrköping, IFK Göteborg – 2022–2023, 2025
- August Mikkelsen – Hammarby – 2023
- Per Edmund Mordt – IFK Göteborg – 1986–1990, 1992
- Erik Nevland – IFK Göteborg – 1999
- Tokmac Nguen – Djurgården – 2024–2025
- **Obilor Okeke** – Hammarby, **Brommapojkarna** – 2025–
- Fredrik Oldrup Jensen – IFK Göteborg – 2018
- Benny Olsen – Enköping – 2003
- Thor André Olsen – Djurgården, Norrköping – 1995–1996, 1999
- Kjetil Osvold – Djurgården – 1988
- **Sivert Engh Øverby** – **Kalmar** – 2026–
- Kjetil Ruthford Pedersen – Elfsborg – 1998–2000
- Steinar Pedersen – IFK Göteborg – 1999–2001
- Tore Pedersen – IFK Göteborg – 1990–1992
- **Sander Ringberg** – **Djurgården** – 2026–
- Roger Risholt – Häcken, GIF Sundsvall – 2006, 2012
- Glenn Roberts – Åtvidaberg – 2010
- Thomas Rogne – IFK Göteborg, Helsingborg – 2015–2017, 2022
- Alexander Ruud Tveter – Halmstad – 2017
- Per Verner Rønning – AIK – 2007
- **Colin Rösler** – Mjällby, **Malmö FF** – 2023–
- Sondre Rossbach – Degerfors – 2023
- **Lars Sætra** – Hammarby, **Kalmar** – 2015–2016, 2021–2024, 2026–
- Vajebah Sakor – IFK Göteborg – 2017–2018
- Harmeet Singh – Kalmar – 2017
- Edvard Skagestad – Norrköping – 2014
- Bent Skammelsrud – Malmö FF – 1990
- Morten Skjønsberg – Norrköping – 2012–2014
- **Nikolai Skuseth** – **Degerfors** – 2026–
- Alexander Søderlund – Häcken – 2020
- Mats Solheim – Kalmar, Hammarby – 2012–2019
- Jan Gunnar Solli – Hammarby – 2015
- Petter Solli – Trelleborg – 1998–1999
- Thomas Sørum – Helsingborg – 2011–2012
- Tom Kåre Staurvik – GIF Sundsvall – 2002–2003
- Arild Stavrum – Helsingborg – 1998–1999
- Lasse Staw – Syrianska – 2012
- Kenneth Storvik – Helsingborg – 1997–1999
- Steinar Strømnes – Åtvidaberg – 2010
- Sander Svendsen – Hammarby – 2017–2018
- Øyvind Svenning – GIF Sundsvall – 2002–2005
- Fredrik Torsteinbø – Hammarby – 2015
- Tomas Totland – Häcken – 2022–2023
- Erik Thorstvedt – IFK Göteborg – 1988
- Anders Trondsen – Göteborg – 2023–2025
- Fredrik Ulvestad – Djurgården – 2018–2020
- Andreas Vindheim – Malmö FF – 2015–2019
- **Brice Wembangomo** – **Häcken** – 2025–
- Gustav Wikheim – Djurgården – 2022–2024
- Fredrik Winsnes – Hammarby – 2002
- Kjetil Wæhler – IFK Göteborg – 2012–2014

=== Pakistan ===
- **Abdullah Iqbal** – **Mjällby** – 2024–

=== Palestine ===
- Wessam Abou Ali – Sirius – 2023
- Assad Al Hamlawi – Helsingborg, Varberg – 2020, 2022–2023
- Ahmed Awad – Dalkurd, Östersund – 2018, 2020–2021
- Mahmoud Eid – Kalmar – 2016–2017, 2019
- **Omar Faraj** – Degerfors, AIK, **Halmstad** – 2022–
- Adam Kaied – Helsingborg – 2022
- Imad Zatara – Brommapojkarna, Syrianska, Åtvidaberg – 2007, 2011–2014

=== Panama ===
- Brunet Hay – Örebro – 2011

=== Paraguay ===
- Antonio Rojas – Halmstad – 2013–2015

=== Peru ===
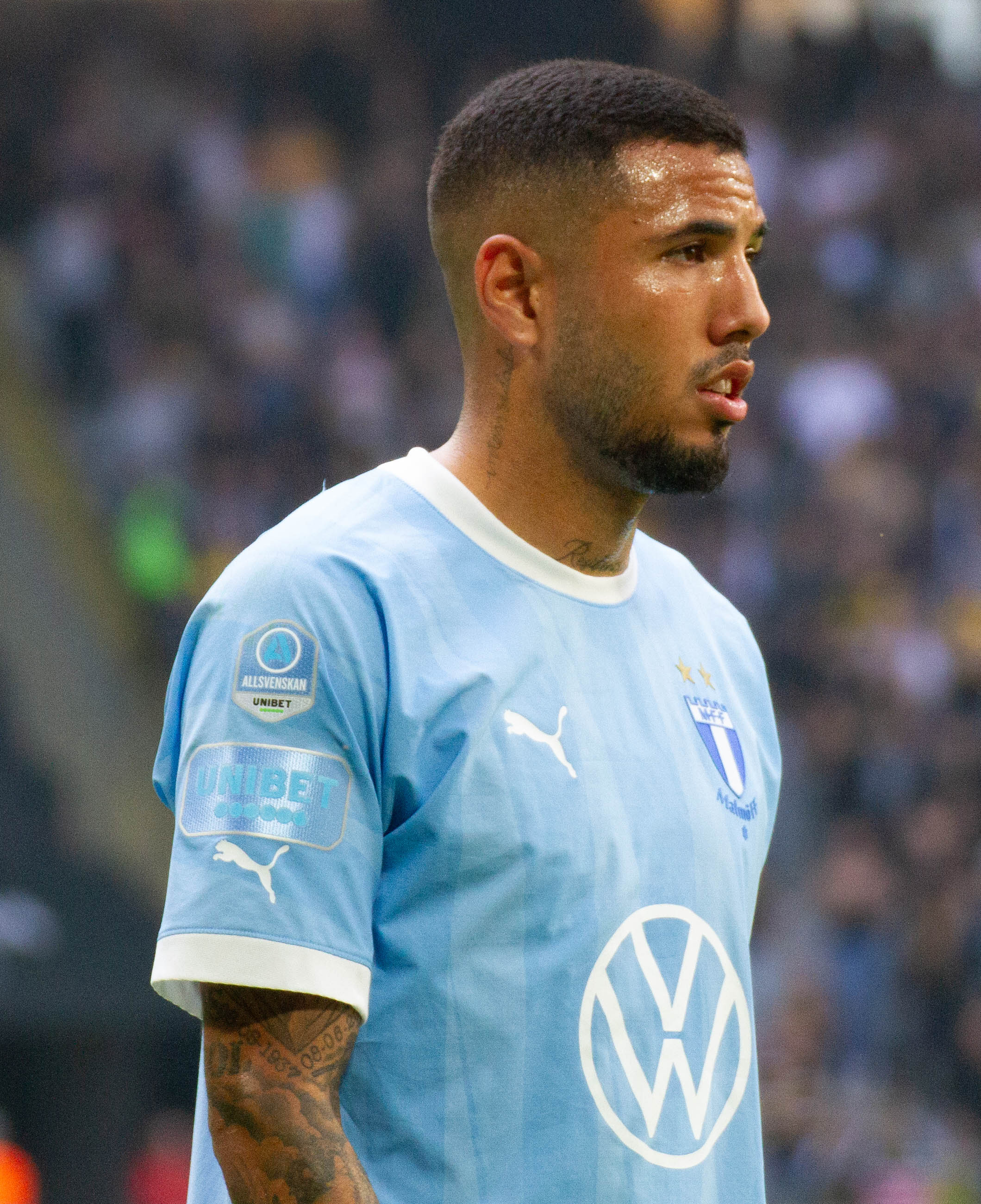
Sergio Peña has played 78 Allsvenskan matches for Malmö FF.

- Sergio Peña – Malmö FF – 2021–2024
- Yoshimar Yotún – Malmö FF – 2015–2017

=== Philippines ===
- Jesper Nyholm – AIK, Djurgården – 2017, 2020–2021

=== Poland ===
- Dawid Banaczek – Norrköping – 2001–2002
- Marcin Burkhardt – Norrköping – 2008
- Paweł Chrupałła – Halmstad – 2025
- Ryszard Jankowski – Trelleborg – 1992–1995
- Mirosław Kubisztal – Örebro – 1991–1997
- Mikołaj Lebedyński – Häcken – 2013
- Fabian Mrozek – Brommapojkarna – 2024
- Krzysztof Pawlak – Trelleborg – 1992
- Piotr Piekarczyk – GAIS – 1990–1991
- Piotr Skrobowski – Hammarby – 1990
- Marek Skurczyński – Trelleborg – 1985
- Michał Sławuta – Ljungskile – 2008
- Tomasz Stolpa – Gefle – 2007
- Igor Sypniewski – Halmstad, Malmö FF, Trelleborg – 2003–2004
- Krystian Szuster – Halmstad – 1990
- Andrzej Woronko – Mjällby – 1983, 1985

=== Portugal ===
- Gabriel Castro – GIF Sundsvall – 2022
- Yago Fernández – Malmö FF – 2010–2011
- Rúben Lameiras – Åtvidaberg – 2015
- Bernardo Morgado – Degerfors – 2025
- Filipe Sisse – Varberg – 2022–2023
- Paulino Tavares – Trelleborg – 2008–2009

=== Romania ===
- Stefan Szilagyi – Ljungskile – 1997

=== Russia ===
- Sergey Andreyev – Öster – 1990
- Vladislav Bragin – AFC Eskilstuna – 2019
- Aleksandr Gitselov – Öster – 1992–1993
- Yevgeny Kharlitov – Norrköping – 1997
- Yevgeni Kobozev – Jönköping – 2017
- Yevgeni Kuznetsov – Norrköping, Öster – 1990–1993, 1997
- Andrey Lebedev – Brage – 1993
- Kirill Pogrebnyak – Falkenberg – 2019
- Sergei Prigoda – Öster – 1990
- Sandro Tsveiba – AFC Eskilstuna – 2019
- Aleksandr Vasyutin – Djurgården – 2021–2022

=== Rwanda ===
- Bobo Bola – Landskrona – 2005
- Olivier Karekezi – Helsingborg – 2005–2007

=== Scotland ===
- Stuart Baxter – Landskrona – 1980
- Billy Davies – Elfsborg – 1986–1987
- Stuart McManus – Örgryte – 1988–1990
- Malcolm McPherson – Norrköping – 1996
- Paul Maguire – Brage – 1984
- **Finlay Neat** – **Sirius** – 2025–
- Andy Roddie – Ljungskile – 1997
- **Robbie Ure** – **Sirius** – 2025–

=== Senegal ===
- Aliou Badji – Djurgården – 2017–2018
- **Mamadou Diagne** – **Västerås** – 2026–
- Mamadou Diallo – IFK Göteborg – 2003
- **Samba Diatara** – **Degerfors** – 2026–
- Papa Alioune Diouf – Kalmar – 2012–2019, 2022
- Lamine Fanne – AIK – 2024
- Abdoulaye Faye – Häcken – 2025
- Malick Mané – IFK Göteborg – 2014

=== Serbia ===
- Veljko Birmančević – Malmö FF – 2021–2022
- Zoran Bulatović – GAIS – 1992
- Slaviša Čula – Örgryte – 1989
- Nenad Đorđević – Kalmar – 2012–2015
- Nikola Đurđić – Helsingborg, Malmö FF, Hammarby, Degerfors – 2012, 2015, 2018–2019, 2021–2023
- Dragan Drljača – Trelleborg – 1997
- Frederick Enaholo – Trelleborg – 1995–1997
- Nikola Gulan – Häcken – 2020
- **Srđan Hrstić** – **Häcken** – 2023–
- Ivan Isaković – Assyriska – 2005
- Budimir Janošević – AIK – 2018–2022
- Ivan Kričak – Mjällby, Öster – 2021–2023, 2025
- Aleksandar Kristić – Degerfors – 1995
- Milan Kuzeljević – V:a Frölunda – 1994
- Danilo Kuzmanović – Djurgården – 2010
- Nenad Lukić – AIK – 2006
- **Filip Manojlović** – **Djurgården** – 2025–
- Nebojša Marinković – Djurgården – 2008
- **Jovan Milosavljević** – **Malmö FF** – 2026–
- Dušan Milutinović – Degerfors – 1997
- Ivica Momčilović – Trelleborg – 1998
- Miljan Mutavdžić – Malmö FF – 2009–2011
- Damjan Pavlović – Degerfors – 2023
- Nikola Petrić – Brommapojkarna – 2018
- Zoran Petrovic – Umeå – 1996
- Bogić Popović – Hammarby – 2000
- Aleksandar Prijović – Djurgården – 2013–2014
- Petar Puača – Helsingborg – 1997
- Bojan Radulović – AIK – 2020–2021
- Milan Simeunović – Malmö FF – 1998–1999
- Dragan Stevović – Ljungskile – 1997
- Dragan Vasiljević – Hammarby – 2000
- **Nikola Zečević** – **Häcken** – 2024–

=== Sierra Leone ===
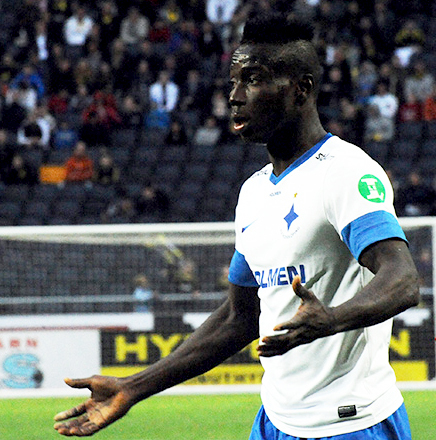
Alhaji Kamara has played 37 Allsvenskan matches for Djurgården and Norrköping.

- Mahmadu Alphajor Bah – Halmstad – 2005
- Gbassay Bangura – Degerfors, Elfsborg – 1997–1998
- Mohamed Bangura – AIK, Elfsborg – 2010–2013, 2015
- Teteh Bangura – AIK – 2011
- Samuel Barlay – Malmö FF – 2005
- Aluspah Brewah – Hammarby – 2004
- Mohamed Buya Turay – AFC Eskilstuna, Dalkurd, Djurgården, Malmö FF – 2017–2019, 2022
- Mohamed Kabia – Syrianska – 2012
- Kemokai Kallon – Ljungskile – 1997
- Alhaji Kamara – Djurgården, Norrköping – 2012, 2014–2015
- Alhassan Kamara – AIK, Örebro, Häcken – 2011–2018
- Alusine Kamara – Syrianska – 2011
- **Momoh Kamara** – **Elfsborg** – 2026–
- Brima Koroma – Enköping, Kalmar – 2003, 2005–2006
- Ibrahim Koroma – Trelleborg – 2010–2011
- Christian Moses – Värnamo – 2022
- John Sama – Degerfors – 1997
- Kabba Samura – IFK Göteborg, Assyriska – 2001–2003, 2005
- Sheriff Suma – GAIS – 2007–2008
- Kevin Wright – Örebro, Sirius – 2019–2022

=== Sint Maarten ===
- Chovanie Amatkarijo – GAIS – 2024–2025

=== Slovakia ===
- Juraj Dovičovič – Djurgården – 2004
- Marek Hamšík – IFK Göteborg – 2021
- Michal Kubala – Ljungskile – 2008

=== Slovenia ===
- Peter Binkovski – Öster – 1996
- Miran Burgić – AIK – 2006–2010
- Dejan Jurkič – Örgryte – 2005–2006
- Andrej Komac – Djurgården – 2006–2009
- Aljoša Matko – Hammarby – 2021
- Ermin Šiljak – Hammarby – 2001
- Ante Šimundža – Malmö FF – 1998
- **Nino Žugelj** – Djurgården, **IFK Göteborg** – 2025–

=== South Africa ===
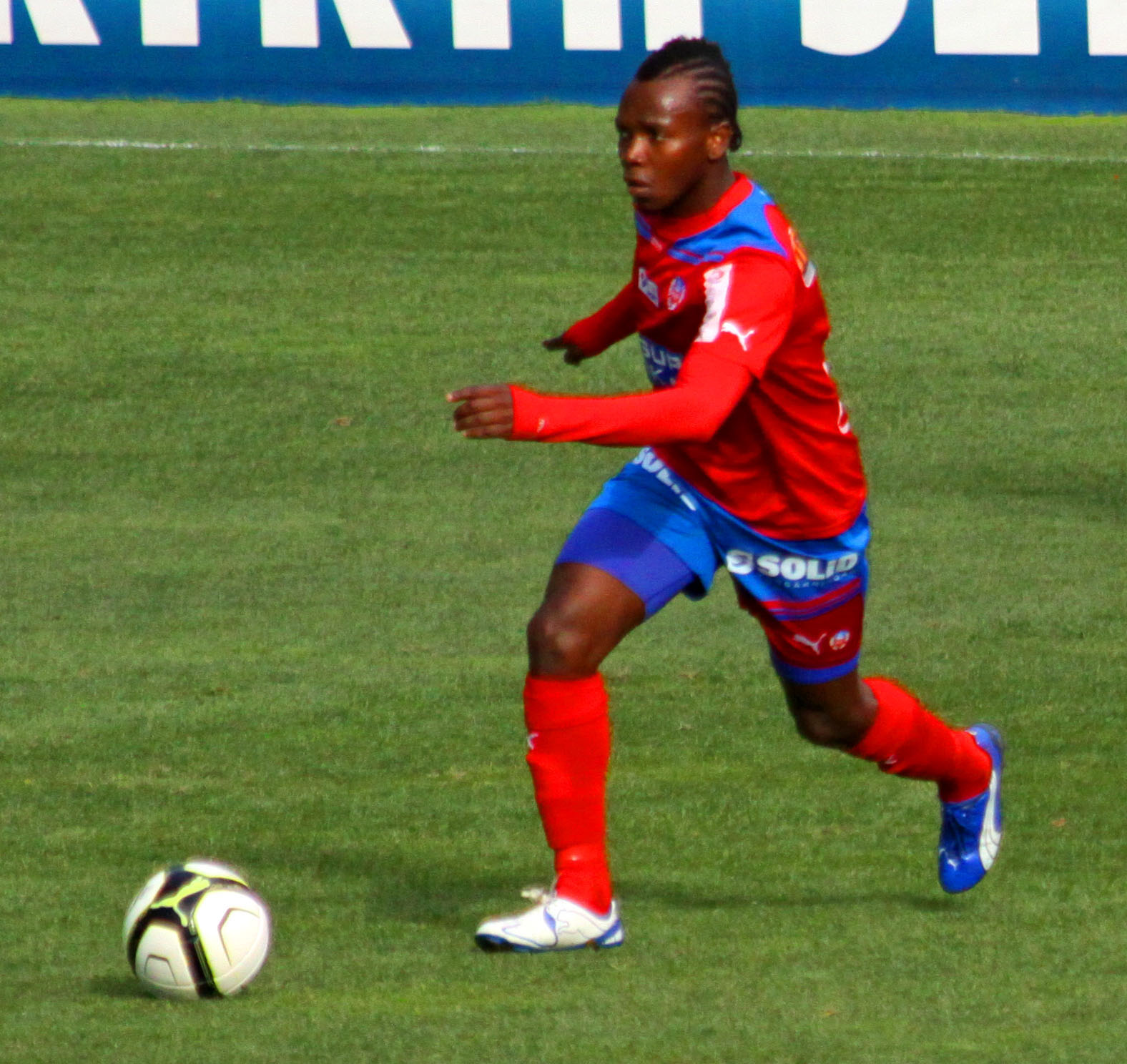
May Mahlangu has played 118 Allsvenskan matches for Helsingborg and IFK Göteborg.

- Stephen Armstrong – V:a Frölunda – 2000
- Keanin Ayer – Varberg – 2020–2021
- Lance Davids – Djurgården – 2006–2008
- Nathan Gibson – Norrköping – 1997
- Liam Jordan – Brommapojkarna – 2023
- Luke Le Roux – Varberg, Värnamo – 2020–2025
- May Mahlangu – Helsingborg, IFK Göteborg – 2009–2014
- Tefu Mashamaite – Häcken – 2015–2016
- Tashreeq Matthews – Helsingborg, Varberg, Sirius – 2019–2023
- Mark Mayambela – Djurgården – 2014
- Mihlali Mayambela – Djurgården – 2016
- Thando Mngomeni – Helsingborg – 2004–2005
- Ryan Moon – Varberg – 2021
- Toni Nhleko – Hammarby – 2006–2007
- Ayanda Nkili – Örebro – 2014–2015
- Siyabonga Nomvethe – Djurgården – 2005
- Nathan Paulse – Hammarby – 2008–2009
- Sive Pekezela – Gefle – 2013–2014
- Surprise Ralani – Helsingborg – 2016
- Tokelo Rantie – Malmö FF – 2012–2013
- **Waylon Renecke** – **Hammarby** – 2026–
- Dean Solomons – Varberg – 2021

=== South Korea ===
- Moon Seon-min – Djurgården – 2015–2016

=== Spain ===
- David Batanero – GIF Sundsvall, Mjällby – 2017–2020
- Cala – Jönköping – 2016–2017
- Juanjo Ciércoles – GIF Sundsvall – 2018–2019
- David Concha – Hammarby – 2022
- Samu de los Reyes – GIF Sundsvall – 2018
- Iván Díaz – Halmstad – 2011
- **Diego García** – **Malmö FF** – 2026–
- Marcos Gondra – Syrianska – 2012
- David Haro – GIF Sundsvall – 2018–2019
- Javi Hernández – Halmstad – 2011
- **Jesús Hernández** – **Degerfors** – 2026–
- José León – AFC Eskilstuna – 2019
- Marc Llinares – Hammarby – 2023–2024
- Francisco Marmolejo Mancilla – Jönköping – 2016–2017
- Brian Martín – Östersund – 2020
- Marc Mas – GIF Sundsvall – 2019
- Pol Moreno – GIF Sundsvall – 2018–2019
- Carlos Moros Gracia – GIF Sundsvall, Mjällby, Djurgården, Degerfors – 2017–2019, 2021–2024
- Maikel Nieves – Brommapojkarna – 2018
- Nauzet Pérez – Halmstad – 2011
- Álex Portillo – Jönköping, Elfsborg – 2016–2017, 2019
- Pol Roigé – GIF Sundsvall – 2019
- Raúl Ruiz – Halmstad – 2011
- Tati Alcalde – Landskrona – 1994
- Francisco Verona – Brage – 1989
- José Zamora – Halmstad – 2011

=== Suriname ===
- **Warner Hahn** – IFK Göteborg, **Hammarby** – 2022, 2024–
- Shaquille Pinas – Hammarby – 2022–2025

=== Switzerland ===
- Feliciano Magro – Landskrona, Djurgården, Norrköping – 2004–2008

=== Syria ===
- Hosam Aiesh – Häcken, Östersund, IFK Göteborg – 2014, 2016–2022
- Mohammad Alsalkhadi – Värnamo – 2024–2025
- Louay Chanko – Djurgården, Malmö FF, Hammarby, Syrianska – 2001–2009, 2012–2013
- Imad Chhadeh – Brommapojkarna – 2007, 2009–2010
- **Ahmad Faqa** – AIK, **Degerfors** – 2024, 2026–
- Daleho Irandust – Häcken, Brommapojkarna – 2017–2021, 2024–2025
- Elias Merkes – Assyriska – 2005
- George Mourad – V:a Frölunda, IFK Göteborg, Syrianska – 2000, 2004–2007, 2012
- **Noah Shamoun** – **Kalmar**, Värnamo – 2021–2023, 2025–

=== Tanzania ===
- Haruna Moshi – Gefle – 2010
- Kali Ongala – GIF Sundsvall – 2008

=== Togo ===
- Lalawélé Atakora – AIK, Helsingborg – 2011–2016
- **Sebastian Clemmensen** – Hammarby, **IFK Göteborg** – 2024–

=== Tunisia ===
- Melke Amri – Hammarby – 1977
- Samir Bakaou – V:a Frölunda, GAIS – 1987–1990
- **Wael Derbali** – **Brommapojkarna** – 2026–
- Issam Jebali – Elfsborg – 2016–2018
- Monir Jelassi – Brommapojkarna – 2023
- **Rami Kaib** – Elfsborg, Djurgården **Halmstad** – 2016–2020, 2023–
- **Amor Layouni** – **Häcken** – 2023–
- Sebastian Tounekti – Hammarby – 2025
- **Ali Youssef** – Häcken, **Mjällby** – 2019–2024, 2026–

=== Turkey ===
- Abdülaziz Demircan – Dalkurd – 2018
- Deniz Hümmet – Trelleborg, Elfsborg, Örebro, Kalmar, Djurgården – 2018–2021, 2023–2024

=== Uganda ===
- John Paul Dembe – Häcken – 2024–2025
- Calvin Kabuye – Mjällby – 2025
- Martin Kayongo-Mutumba – AIK – 2009–2014
- Abdu Lumala – Kalmar – 2016
- Ronald Mukiibi – Häcken, Östersund, Degerfors – 2014, 2016–2022
- Abubaker Tabula – GIF Sundsvall – 2008

=== Ukraine ===
- Ivan Bobko – AFC Eskilstuna – 2019
- Viktor Khlus – GAIS – 1989
- Ihor Levchenko – AFC Eskilstuna – 2019
- **Bohdan Milovanov** – **Sirius** – 2025–
- Vadym Yevtushenko – AIK – 1989–1993

=== United States ===
- Gale Agbossoumonde – Djurgården – 2011
- Alejandro Bedoya – Örebro – 2009–2011
- Colin Burns – Ljungskile – 2009
- Joe Corona – GIF Sundsvall – 2022
- D. J. Countess – Öster – 2006
- Charlie Davies – Hammarby – 2007–2009
- Alex DeJohn – Dalkurd – 2018
- Mix Diskerud – IFK Göteborg, Helsingborg – 2017–2018, 2020
- John Doyle – Örgryte – 1990
- Jeffrey Gal – Degerfors – 2021–2022
- Romain Gall – Sundsvall, Malmö FF, Örebro – 2017–2022
- Joe Gyau – Degerfors – 2022–2023
- Brendan Hines-Ike – Örebro – 2016–2018
- **Ian Hoffmann** – **Mjällby** – 2026–
- Aron Jóhannsson – Hammarby – 2019–2020
- **Aboubacar Keita** – **Kalmar** – 2026–
- Forrest Lasso – GIF Sundsvall – 2022
- Kristoffer Lund – Häcken – 2021–2023
- Ryan Miller – Halmstad – 2010–2011
- Hugo Pérez – Örgryte – 1990
- Samuel Petrone – Mjällby – 2012
- Thomas Philipps – GAIS – 1988
- Matt Pyzdrowski – Helsingborg – 2015–2016
- Ryan Raybould – Gefle – 2008
- Kofi Sarkodie – Trelleborg – 2018
- Johann Smith – Kalmar – 2010
- Brian Span – Djurgården – 2012–2013
- Andrew Stadler – Östersund, Dalkurd – 2016, 2018
- McKinley Tennyson – GIF Sundsvall – 2001
- Michael Thomas – Halmstad – 2010
- Mark White – Hammarby – 1986
- Josh Wicks – Sirius – 2017–2018

=== Uruguay ===
- Jorge Anchén – AIK – 2008
- Felipe Carvalho – Malmö FF, Falkenberg – 2015–2017
- Sebastián Eguren – Hammarby, AIK – 2006–2008, 2010
- Alejandro Lago – IFK Göteborg – 2006
- Diego Lugano – Häcken – 2015

=== Zambia ===
- Emmanuel Banda – Djurgården – 2020–2022
- Isaac Chansa – Helsingborg – 2007–2009
- Edward Chilufya – Djurgården, Häcken – 2018–2021, 2023–2024
- Clifford Mulenga – Örgryte – 2005
- Boyd Mwila – Örgryte, Djurgården – 2003–2006, 2009
- Edwin Phiri – Örgryte, Ljungskile – 2003–2005, 2008
- Dominic Yobe – Örgryte – 2004–2006

=== Zimbabwe ===
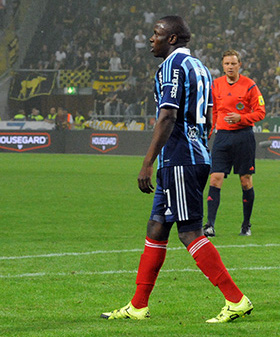
Nyasha Mushekwi has played 21 Allsvenskan matches for Djurgården.

- Kundai Benyu – Helsingborg – 2019
- Archford Gutu – Kalmar – 2012–2013
- Tino Kadewere – Djurgården – 2015–2018
- Nyasha Mushekwi – Djurgården – 2015
- Matthew Rusike – Halmstad, Helsingborg – 2015–2016

== See also ==
- List of Allsvenskan players
- List of foreign Superettan players
- List of foreign Damallsvenskan players

== Notes ==
1. Born in Algeria
2. Born in Azerbaijan (then part of the Soviet Union)
3. Born in Belgium
4. Born in Brazil
5. Born in Bulgaria
6. Born in Cameroon
7. Born in Denmark
8. Born in England
9. Born in Spain
10. Born in El Salvador
11. Born in Finland
12. Born in France
13. Born in The Gambia
14. Born in Germany
15. Born in Greece
16. Born in Iran
17. Born in Iraq
18. Born in Israel
19. Born in Kenya
20. Born in Kosovo (then part of Yugoslavia)
21. Born in Saudi Arabia
22. Born in Lebanon
23. Born in Liberia
24. Born in Morocco
25. Born in North Macedonia
26. Born in the Netherlands
27. Born in Nigeria
28. Born in Norway
29. Born in Portugal
30. Born in Russia (then part of the Soviet Union)
31. Born in Scotland
32. Born in Serbia (then Serbia and Montenegro)
33. Born in Serbia (then part of Yugoslavia)
34. Born in Switzerland
35. Born in Sweden
36. Born in Ukraine
37. Born in Zaire
38. Capped for the Albania national football team
39. Capped for the Albania national under-16 football team
40. Capped for the Algeria national under-23 football team
41. Capped for the Belgium national under-15 football team
42. Capped for the Belgium national under-16 football team
43. Capped for the Belgium national under-17 football team
44. Capped for the Belgium national under-18 football team
45. Capped for the Belgium national under-19 football team
46. Capped for the Denmark national under-16 football team
47. Capped for the Denmark national under-17 football team
48. Capped for the Denmark national under-18 football team
49. Capped for the Denmark national under-19 football team
50. Capped for the Denmark national under-20 football team
51. Capped for the Denmark national under-21 football team
52. Capped for the England national under-16 football team
53. Capped for the England national under-17 football team
54. Capped for the England national under-18 football team
55. Capped for the England national under-19 football team
56. Capped for the England national under-21 football team
57. Capped for the England national football C team
58. Capped for the Finland national under-17 football team
59. Capped for the Finland national under-18 football team
60. Capped for the Finland national under-19 football team
61. Capped for the France national under-19 football team
62. Capped for the Germany national under-17 football team
63. Capped for the Germany national under-18 football team
64. Capped for the Iceland national under-21 football team
65. Capped for the Morocco national under-17 football team
66. Capped for the Mexico national under-22 football team
67. Capped for the North Macedonia national under-21 football team
68. Capped for the Netherlands national under-16 football team
69. Capped for the Netherlands national under-17 football team
70. Capped for the Netherlands national under-19 football team
71. Capped for the Netherlands national under-20 football team
72. Capped for the Netherlands national under-21 football team
73. Capped for the Norway national under-15 football team
74. Capped for the Norway national under-16 football team
75. Capped for the Norway national under-17 football team
76. Capped for the Norway national under-18 football team
77. Capped for the Norway national under-19 football team
78. Capped for the Norway national under-21 football team
79. Capped for the Norway national football team
80. Capped for the Serbia national under-19 football team
81. Capped for the Serbia national under-21 football team
82. Capped for the Switzerland national under-21 football team
83. Capped for the Sweden national under-16 football team
84. Capped for the Sweden men's national under-17 football team
85. Capped for the Sweden men's national under-18 football team
86. Capped for the Sweden men's national under-19 football team
87. Capped for the Sweden national under-20 football team
88. Capped for the Sweden national under-21 football team
89. Capped for the Sweden men's national football team
