= Magnus Powell =

Swedish footballer and manager

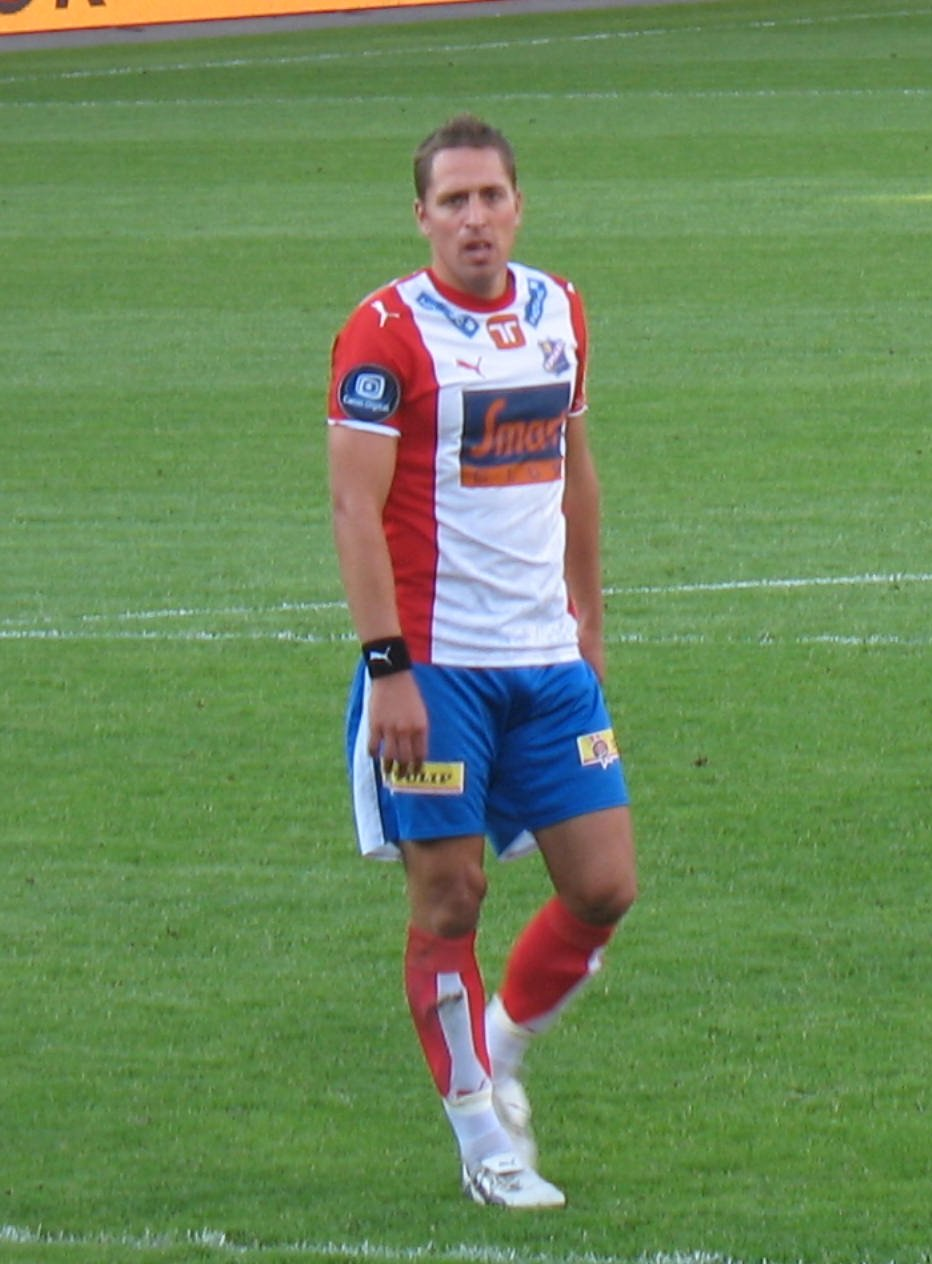
- Powell with Lyn in 2007

Personal information
- Full name: Erik Magnus Powell
- Date of birth: 28 October 1974 (age 51)
- Place of birth: Örnsköldsvik, Sweden
- Position: Striker

Senior career*
Years	Team	Apps	(Gls)
1991–1994	Örebro SK	40	(7)
1995–1999	Helsingborgs IF	111	(26)
2000–2005	Lillestrøm	98	(31)
2006–2008	Lyn	52	(6)
2008–2009	GIF Sundsvall	21	(1)
Total		322	(71)

International career
1990–1991	Sweden U17	11	(0)
1992–1993	Sweden U19	5	(2)
1993–1995	Sweden U21	13	(3)

Managerial career
- 2010–2014: Lillestrøm (youth)
- 2015: Egersund
- 2015–2017: Levanger
- 2018: Sandefjord
- 2018–2019: Levanger
- 2021: 07 Vestur
- 2022–2024: Östersund
- 2025–2026: KÍ Klaksvik
- * Club domestic league appearances and goals

Erik Magnus Powell (born 28 October 1974) is a Swedish professional football manager and former player who played as a striker. He was most recently the head coach of Faroe Islands Premier League club KÍ Klaksvik.

== Club career ==
Powell was born in Örnsköldsvik to English footballer Ronald Powell. He played in the Swedish Allsvenskan from 1995 to 1999 for Helsingborgs IF and Örebro SK. He was an important part of the 1999 Helsingborg team that won the championship in Sweden, scoring eight goals in 24 matches. At the start of the 2000 season, Powell was sold to Lillestrøm SK for £350,000 to replace Icelandic international Heiðar Helguson. Although he struggled with injuries, Powell was a key member of the Lillestrøm squad after arriving in 2000, scoring 29 goals in 73 league matches. During his last seasons with Lillestrøm, he was the team captain. On 26 January 2006, Powell was transferred to Lyn for NOK 500,000. His active career as a player was ended in the Swedish team GIF Sundsvall, where he was also the assistant coach.

== International career ==
Powell represented the Sweden U17, U19, and U21 teams a combined total of 29 times, scoring five goals.

== Honours ==
=== Player ===
Helsingborgs IF

- Allsvenskan: 1999
- Svenska Cupen: 1997–98

=== Manager ===
KÍ Klaksvik

- Faroe Islands Premier League: 2025
