= Sam Ayorinde =

Nigerian footballer (born 1974)

Personal information
- Full name: Samuel Tayo Ayorinde
- Date of birth: 20 October 1974 (age 52)
- Place of birth: Lagos, Nigeria
- Height: 1.80 m (5 ft 11 in)
- Position: Striker

Senior career*
Years	Team	Apps	(Gls)
1991–1993	NEPA Lagos		
1993–1994	Stade Tunisien	0	(0)
1994–1995	Sturm Graz	0	(0)
1995–1997	Leyton Orient	13	(2)
1997	FF Jaro	20	(4)
1997–1998	Dover Athletic	5	(5)
1998–1999	Bangor City	9	(3)
1999	Stade Tunisien	4	(1)
1999–2000	Hapoel Beit She'an	0	(0)
2000–2001	Assyriska	50	(14)
2001–2002	Stalybridge Celtic	19	(6)
2002–2003	AIK	12	(2)
2003–2004	Shenyang Ginde	14	(2)
2004–2005	Syrianska		
2005–2006	Da Nang	0	(0)
2007	Persija Jakarta	13	(1)
2008	Gröndals IK	6	(1)
2009	Djurgårdsbrunns FC	4	(0)
Total		169	(41)

International career
1998–2003	Nigeria	2	(0)
- * Club domestic league appearances and goals

Samuel Ayorinde (born 20 October 1974) is a Nigerian former footballer who played at both professional and international levels. A striker, he played professionally for a number clubs throughout Africa, Europe and Asia, and he represented Nigeria at senior international level.

== Club career ==
Ayorinde was born in Lagos on 20 October 1974, and played club football for NEPA Lagos, Stade Tunisien and Sturm Graz, before joining Leyton Orient in September 1995 though a lengthy wait for a work permit meant he did not make his league debut against Cambridge United until May 1996. He made 16 league and cup appearances for Orient, scoring two goals, but could not hold down a place in the first team and, after a succession of loan moves, transferred to Football Conference side Dover Athletic in December 1997. He later played for Bangor City, Hapoel Beit She'an, Assyriska, Stalybridge Celtic, AIK, Shenyang Ginde, Syrianska, Da Nang, Persija Jakarta, Gröndals IK and Djurgårdsbrunns FC.

== International career ==
Ayorinde earned two caps for Nigeria between 1998 and 2003.
