= Sive Pekezela =

South African soccer player

Personal information
- Full name: Sive Ricardo Pekezela
- Date of birth: 3 April 1992 (age 34)
- Place of birth: Gugulethu, Cape Town, South Africa
- Height: 1.75 m (5 ft 9 in)
- Positions: Midfielder; defender

Youth career
- Rovers United
- Vasco Da Gama
- F.C. Cape Town
- 2009–2011: ASD Cape Town

Senior career*
Years	Team	Apps	(Gls)
2011–2012	Beerschot AC	0	(0)
2013–2014	Gefle IF	11	(0)
2016	All Stars	0	(0)
- * Club domestic league appearances and goals

Sive Ricardo Pekezela (born 3 April 1992) is a South African former soccer player who played as a midfielder.

== Career ==
Pekezela started out playing street football in Cape Town before joining the youth ranks of Vasco Da Gama when he was 11 years old. In 2009, he joined the ASD Cape Town Academy. They went on a tour to Belgium in 2011 where he impressed enough to get picked up by Belgian club Beerschot AC. He was however let go after only one season due to the club's financial situation and returned to South Africa. During the autumn of 2012 he came to Sweden where he trialed with GIF Sundsvall, Enköpings SK and Gefle IF. In early 2013 he eventually ended up signing with Allsvenskan club Gefle IF.
