= Dragan Vasiljević =

Serbian footballer

Dragan Vasilijević
Personal information
- Full name: Dragan Vasilijević
- Date of birth: 27 July 1971 (age 55)
- Height: 1.80 m (5 ft 11 in)
- Position: Defender

Senior career*
Years	Team	Apps	(Gls)
1995–1996	Beograd		
1996–1997	Radnički Niš	25	(5)
1997–1998	KV Mechelen	22	(0)
1998–1999	Radnički Niš	6	(0)
1998–1999	Obilić	0	(0)
1999–2000	Radnički Niš	15	(2)
2000	Hammarby	3	(0)
2002–2003	Car Konstantin	26	(6)
2003–2004	Radnički Niš	5	(0)
2004	Fjölnir	12	(1)
2004–2005	Novi Sad	3	(0)
Total		117	(14)
- * Club domestic league appearances and goals

Dragan Vasilijevic (Serbian Cyrillic: Драган Васиљевић; born 27 July 1971) is a former Serbian footballer.

== Career ==
He played with FK Beograd from where he moved to First League of FR Yugoslavia club FK Radnički Niš. In the season 1997–98 he played in Belgium with second level side KV Mechelen.

=== Hammarby IF ===
After seeing video tapes of Vasiljević and fellow Yugoslav player Bogić Popović, Hammarby bought the two players in December 1999. Vasiljević made his Allsvenskan debut in the premiere against GIF Sundsvall. In total, he played three matches for Hammarby IF.

In 2004, he played with Ungmennafélagið Fjölnir in the 1. deild.
