= Bidemi Olalekan Amole =

Nigerian professional footballer

Bidemi Olalekan Amole (born November 9, 2007) is a Nigerian professional footballer who plays as a midfielder for Swedish club IF Brommapojkarna on loan from the Nigerian academy Real Sapphire FC. He played for Nigeria at under 20- level.

== Early life and youth career ==
Amole started his football progress with the youth system of Real Sapphire FC in Nigeria. In 2024 he also played alongside with the sporting Lagos academy at the gothia cup in Sweden. Through the tournament, he was able to Trainee with the Swedish club Djurgardens IF.

== Club career ==
Amelo grow through the youth system of Real Sapphire FC in Nigeria. He played the creative championship (TCC) league.

In 2006, Amole was signed by Brommapojkarna on a loan deal from Real Sapphire FC but with an option to later make the transfer permanent .

He played the Nigerian national football team, when Aliyu Zubairu was the coach.
