= Pekka Mattila (footballer) =

Finnish former footballer (born 1967)

Personal information
- Date of birth: 9 July 1967 (age 59)
- Place of birth: Pori, Finland
- Height: 1.89 m (6 ft 2 in)
- Position: Midfielder

Youth career
- 1978–1986: Ilves

Senior career*
| Years | Team | Apps | (Gls) |
| 1986 | Ilves | 7 | (1) |
| 1987 | Kuopion Elo | 21 | (3) |
| 1988 | Ilves | 26 | (4) |
| 1989 | GIF Sundsvall | 14 | (0) |
| 1990–1994 | Ilves | 102 | (11) |
| 1994–1995 | FinnPa | 37 | (5) |
| 1996 | Ilves | 22 | (3) |
- * Club domestic league appearances and goals

Pekka Mattila (born 9 July 1967) is a Finnish former professional footballer who played as a midfielder.

== Club career ==
During his career, he made 194 appearances and scored 24 goals in Finnish top-tiers Mestaruussarja and Veikkausliiga for Ilves and Finnairin Palloilijat. Additionally he played for Kuopion Elo in Finnish second-tier Ykkönen and GIF Sundsvall in Swedish Allsvenskan. While playing for Ilves, they won the Finnish Cup in 1990.

== Career statistics ==
As of 26 April 2025

Appearances and goals by club, season and competition
| Club | Season | League | | | Europe | | Total | |
| Club | Season | Division | Apps | Goals | Apps | Goals | Apps | Goals |
|---|---|---|---|---|---|---|---|---|
| Ilves | 1986 | Mestaruussarja | 7 | 1 | – | | 7 | 1 |
| Elo Kuopio | 1987 | Ykkönen | 21 | 3 | – | | 21 | 3 |
| Ilves | 1988 | Mestaruussarja | 26 | 4 | – | | 26 | 4 |
| GIF Sundsvall | 1989 | Allsvenskan | 14 | 0 | – | | 14 | 0 |
| Ilves | 1990 | Veikkausliiga | 15 | 0 | – | | 15 | 0 |
| Ilves | 1991 | Veikkausliiga | 32 | 3 | 4 (Note: Appearances in UEFA Cup Winners' Cup) | 2 | 36 | 5 |
| Ilves | 1992 | Veikkausliiga | 23 | 3 | – | | 23 | 3 |
| Ilves | 1993 | Veikkausliiga | 19 | 4 | – | | 19 | 4 |
| Ilves | 1994 | Veikkausliiga | 13 | 1 | – | | 13 | 1 |
| Ilves | Total | | 102 | 11 | 4 | 2 | 106 | 13 |
| FinnPa | 1994 | Veikkausliiga | 13 | 4 | – | | 13 | 4 |
| FinnPa | 1995 | Veikkausliiga | 24 | 2 | – | | 24 | 2 |
| FinnPa | Total | | 37 | 6 | 0 | 0 | 37 | 6 |
| Ilves | 1996 | Veikkausliiga | 22 | 3 | – | | 22 | 3 |
| Career total | | | 229 | 28 | 4 | 2 | 233 | 30 |

== Honours ==
Ilves

- Finnish Cup: 1990
