= Ghassan Heamed =

Iraqi footballer and manager (born 1971)

Personal information
- Full name: Ghassan Raouf Heamed
- Date of birth: 18 December 1971 (age 54)
- Place of birth: Baghdad, Iraq
- Position: Defender

Senior career*
Years	Team	Apps	(Gls)
1986–1988	Al-Shorta Baghdad		
1988–1990	Al-Naft Baghdad		
1990–1991	Al-Talaba Baghdad		
1991–1993	Al-Quwa Al-Jawiya		
1994–1995	Sportul Studențesc	10	(0)
1995–2005	Assyriska	170	(13)
2005	Club Africain		
Total		180	(13)

International career
1989–1993	Iraq	5	(0)

Managerial career
- 2021: Assyriska
- * Club domestic league appearances and goals

Ghassan Raouf Heamed (born 18 December 1971) is an Iraqi football manager and former player who managed Assyriska.

== Career ==
=== Playing career ===
Heamed started his career with Romanian side Sportul Studențesc. In 1995, he signed for Assyriska in the Swedish second tier, helping them earn promotion to the Swedish top flight. In 2005, Heamed signed for Tunisian club Club Africain.

=== Managerial career ===
In 2021, he was appointed manager of Assyriska in Sweden.
