= Ronald Powell (footballer) =

English footballer

Personal information
- Full name: Ronald Powell
- Date of birth: 19 November 1947 (age 78)
- Place of birth: Leeds
- Position: Striker

Senior career*
Years	Team	Apps	(Gls)
1969-1971	Husums IF		
1971-1975	Brynäs IF	19	(4)
1975-1990	Husums IF		
- * Club domestic league appearances and goals

Ronald "Ronnie" Powell (born 19 November 1947) is an English former footballer. Powell came from Leeds to Örnsköldsvik, Sweden, at the age of 21 as a foreign exchange student to work at the local paper mill. While there he met his future wife and this led to him staying.

Powell, an amateur footballer back in England, started playing for Husums IF, a small club in the lower tiers located outside Örnsköldsvik. After a couple of seasons he was contracted by Brynäs IF, then in the Swedish 2nd division. Brynäs was promoted to the top tier after the 1973 season and on 13 April 1974, he became the first foreign player in Allsvenskan when debuting in the Brynäs IF away game against Halmstads BK. In his next game, against IFK Norrköping he became the first foreign player to score a goal in Allsvenskan.

In total, he made 19 Allsvenskan matches for Brynäs IF and scored four goals. Brynäs only won 2 games and was relegated. Powell went back to his old club, Husum, and stayed on until way past his 40th birthday.

Ronald Powell is the father of Swedish footballer Magnus Powell.
