= Edwin Phiri =

Zambian footballer (born 1983)

Personal information
- Date of birth: 17 September 1983 (age 43)
- Height: 1.76 m (5 ft 9 1/2 in)
- Position: Right back

Senior career*
Years	Team	Apps	(Gls)
2001	Chiparamba Great Eagles		
2002–2005	Örgryte IS	41	(1)
2006–2010	Ljungskile SK	96	(1)
2011–2014	FC Trollhättan	78	(1)
2015–XXXX	FK Kozara		

International career
2004	Zambia	2	(0)
- * Club domestic league appearances and goals as of 18:25, 21 January 2015 (UTC)

Edwin Phiri (born 17 September 1983) is a Zambian international footballer who last played for FK Kozara as a right back.

== Career ==
Phiri has played club football in Zambia and Sweden for Chiparamba Great Eagles, Örgryte IS, Ljungskile SK and FC Trollhättan in 2011.

Phiri earned two international caps for Zambia in 2004, both of which came in FIFA World Cup qualifying matches.
