= Ulf Kortesniemi =

Finnish former footballer (born 1966)

Personal information
- Date of birth: 28 March 1966 (age 60)
- Place of birth: Finland
- Height: 1.78 m (5 ft 10 in)
- Position: Goalkeeper

Senior career*
| Years | Team | Apps | (Gls) |
| 1985–1986 | Jaro | 20 | (0) |
| 1987–1988 | IFK Mariehamn | | |
| 1989–1990 | Nykarleby IK | | |
| 1991–1994 | BK-IFK | | |
| 1993 | → Jaro (loan) | 1 | (0) |
| 1995 | VPS | 26 | (0) |
| 1996–1997 | Ljungskile SK | 38 | (0) |
| 1998–2000 | Kiisto | | |
- * Club domestic league appearances and goals

Ulf Kortesniemi (born 28 March 1966) is a Finnish former football player who played as a goalkeeper. During his career, he made 27 total appearances in Finnish top-tier Veikkausliiga for Jaro and VPS. In addition, he played for Ljungskile SK in Sweden, where he helped the club to promote to Allsvenskan for the 1997 season, and made 14 appearances in the Swedish top level.

After his playing career, he coached in the SJK Seinäjoki organisation, Närpes Kraft, Korsholm and the women's team of FC Sport in Naisten Ykkönen.

== Honours ==
Ljungskile

- Swedish Division 1, Group Södra runner-up: 1996
