= Bogić Popović =

Serbian footballer

Personal information
- Full name: Bogić Popović
- Date of birth: 10 March 1974 (age 52)
- Place of birth: Belgrade, SFR Yugoslavia
- Height: 1.87 m (6 ft 1 1/2 in)
- Position: Forward

Senior career*
Years	Team	Apps	(Gls)
1996–1999	Hajduk Beograd		
1999	OFK Beograd	1	(0)
1999–2000	Hajduk Beograd	18	(14)
2000	Hammarby	1	(0)
2001	Železnik	6	(1)
2001–2005	Hajduk Beograd	90	(56)
- * Club domestic league appearances and goals

Bogić Popović (Serbian Cyrillic: Богић Поповић; born 10 March 1974) is a former Serbian footballer.

== Career ==
=== Hajduk Belgrade ===
In the 1999–00 Hajduk Beograd season, Popović scored 14 goals in the 1999–2000 First League of FR Yugoslavia. Tall and heavy, he made use of his physical characteristics in order to become a prolific goalscorer in the First and Second leagues of FR Yugoslavia.

=== Hammarby IF ===
After seeing video tapes of Popović and fellow Yugoslav player Dragan Vasiljević, Hammarby bought the two players, Popović for 4 million kronor. Popović played one match for Hammarby IF, the 0–1 loss against Sundsvall in the 2000 Allsvenskan première. After argues with Hammarby coach Sören Cratz, he left Hammarby in June 2000.

By summer 2012 he was the director of the youth sections of Hajduk Beograd and still holding that post by March 2015.
