= List of Swedish football transfers summer 2025 =

This is a list of Swedish football transfers for the 2025 summer transfer window. Only transfers featuring Allsvenskan and Superettan are listed.

== Allsvenskan ==
Note: Flags indicate national team as has been defined under FIFA eligibility rules. Players may hold more than one non-FIFA nationality.

=== Malmö ===
In:

No.	Pos.	Nation	Player
5	DF	MNE	Andrej Đurić (from (Serbia) Red Star Belgrade)
15	MF	GUI	Salifou Soumah (from (Azerbaijan) Zira)
30	GK	SWE	Robin Olsen (from (England) Aston Villa)

Out:

No.	Pos.	Nation	Player
9	FW	SWE	Isaac Kiese Thelin (free agent)
34	MF	SWE	Zakaria Loukili (on loan to Varberg)
—	MF	KOS	Patriot Sejdiu (on loan to Öster, previously on loan at (Netherlands) Roda JC)
—	FW	DEN	Sebastian Jørgensen (on loan to (Denmark) AGF, previously on loan at Norrköping)
—	GK	SWE	Marcus Pettersson (to Landskrona, previously on loan)
—	DF	GAM	Joseph Ceesay (to (Italy) Empoli, previously on loan at (Italy) Cesena)

=== Hammarby ===
In:

No.	Pos.	Nation	Player
23	FW	NOR	Obilor Okeke (from (Norway) KFUM)
—	FW	SWE	Nikola Vasić (from Brommapojkarna)
—	DF	JPN	Yusei Shima (from (Japan) Ehime)
—	MF	LBR	Saah Moses Jr. (from (Liberia) Discoveries SA)
—	FW	NGA	Samuel Adindu (from (Nigeria) Future PA)

Out:

No.	Pos.	Nation	Player
23	FW	SWE	Abdelrahman Boudah (to (Japan) Albirex Niigata)
—	DF	JPN	Yusei Shima (on loan to Hammarby TFF)
—	MF	LBR	Saah Moses Jr. (on loan to Hammarby TFF)
—	FW	NGA	Samuel Adindu (on loan to Hammarby TFF)
—	DF	GHA	Kingsley Gyamfi (to Öster, previously on loan)
—	MF	SWE	Jardell Kanga (to (Finland) Ilves, previously on loan)
—	MF	ALB	Gent Elezaj (to Landskrona, previously on loan at Hammarby TFF)
—	MF	NIG	Mamane Amadou Sabo (to (Serbia) Javor Matis, previously on loan at (Albania) Skënderbeu)
—	FW	CMR	Saidou Alioum (to Göteborg, previously on loan at (Cyprus) Omonia)

=== AIK ===
In:

No.	Pos.	Nation	Player
14	DF	SWE	Fredrik Nissen (from (Italy) Milan Primavera)
20	FW	NOR	Erik Flataker (from (Norway) Sogndal)
22	FW	SWE	Adrian Helm (from Ljungskile)
—	DF	SWE	Wilmer Olofsson (from (Netherlands) Jong AZ)

Out:

No.	Pos.	Nation	Player
9	FW	CYP	Andronikos Kakoullis (on loan to (Cyprus) Aris Limassol)
20	MF	SWE	Oscar Uddenäs (loan return to (Netherlands) Excelsior)
22	DF	FIN	Jere Uronen (on loan to (Greece) Atromitos)
25	FW	SWE	William Hofvander (on loan to Örgryte)
29	FW	IRQ	Danilo Al-Saed (loan return to (Netherlands) Heerenveen)
—	DF	SWE	Wilmer Olofsson (on loan to Eskilstuna)

=== Djurgården ===
In:

No.	Pos.	Nation	Player
16	FW	NOR	Bo Hegland (from (Norway) Moss)
17	MF	ISL	Mikael Anderson (from (Denmark) AGF)

Out:

No.	Pos.	Nation	Player
19	DF	SWE	Viktor Bergh (on loan to (Germany) Hansa Rostock)
—	GK	SWE	Max Croon (on loan to Östersund, previously on loan at Viggbyholm)
—	FW	SWE	Kalipha Jawla (on loan to Utsikten, previously on loan at Östersund)
—	DF	DEN	Peter Therkildsen (to (Poland) Widzew Łódź, previously on loan)

=== Mjällby ===
In:

No.	Pos.	Nation	Player
2	DF	SWE	Ludvig Svanberg (from Sundsvall)
3	DF	CMR	Christian Tchouante (from (United States) Ventura County)
10	MF	DEN	Jeppe Kjær (from (Norway) Bodø/Glimt)
—	MF	SWE	Teo Helge (from Norrby)

Out:

No.	Pos.	Nation	Player
9	FW	UGA	Calvin Kabuye (on loan to Varberg)
10	MF	DEN	Nicklas Røjkjær (to (Denmark) Nordsjælland)
13	DF	DEN	Jakob Kiilerich (to (Belgium) Zulte Waregem)
25	DF	KOS	Argjend Miftari (on loan to Karlstad)
—	MF	SWE	Teo Helge (on loan to Norrby)
—	MF	SWE	Filip Åkesson Linderoth (on loan to Sölvesborg, previously on loan at Hässleholm)

=== GAIS ===
In:

No.	Pos.	Nation	Player
—	FW	SWE	Shalom Ekong (from Stocksund)
—	MF	SWE	Elias Younan (from Skövde)

Out:

No.	Pos.	Nation	Player
20	FW	SWE	Chisomnazu Chika Chidi (on loan to Norrby)
21	MF	SWE	Axel Henriksson (to (England) Blackburn Rovers)
26	FW	SMA	Chovanie Amatkarijo (on loan to Östersund)
30	GK	SWE	Victor Astor (on loan to Trelleborg)
—	MF	SWE	Elias Younan (on loan to Skövde)
—	MF	SWE	Mohamed Bawa (on loan to Trollhättan, previously on loan at Östersund)

=== Elfsborg ===
In:

No.	Pos.	Nation	Player
5	MF	BRA	Wenderson (from Värnamo)
24	FW	DEN	Frederik Ihler (from (Norway) Molde, previously on loan)

Out:

No.	Pos.	Nation	Player
19	DF	TUN	Rami Kaib (on loan to Halmstad)
26	MF	SWE	Ludvig Richtnér (on loan to Örebro)

=== Häcken ===
In:

No.	Pos.	Nation	Player
7	MF	DEN	Sanders Ngabo (from (Denmark) Horsens)
18	FW	IRQ	Danilo Al-Saed (from (Netherlands) Heerenveen, previously on loan at AIK)
20	FW	FIN	Adrian Svanbäck (from Helsingborg)
23	DF	SWE	Olle Samuelsson (from Sandviken)
25	MF	TAN	Sabri Kondo (from (Tanzania) Singida Black Stars)
31	MF	DEN	Lasse Madsen (from (Denmark) Silkeborg U19)
—	FW	CIV	Christ Wawa (from (Ivory Coast) RC Abidjan)

Out:

No.	Pos.	Nation	Player
25	DF	SEN	Abdoulaye Faye (to (Germany) Bayer Leverkusen)
27	FW	SWE	Zeidane Inoussa (to (Wales) Swansea City)
—	FW	SWE	Jeremy Agbonifo (to (France) Lens, previously on loan)

=== Sirius ===
In:

No.	Pos.	Nation	Player
2	DF	SWE	Henrik Castegren (from (Hungary) Debrecen)
22	DF	SWE	Oscar Krusnell (from (Norway) Haugesund)
23	FW	SCO	Finlay Neat (from Malmö U19)
27	FW	SWE	Neo Jönsson (from (Denmark) Copenhagen U19)
—	DF	SWE	Ben Magnusson (from Göteborg U19)

Out:

No.	Pos.	Nation	Player
2	DF	SWE	Patrick Nwadike (to (Slovakia) Spartak Trnava)
8	MF	DEN	Andreas Pyndt (on loan to (Denmark) Fredericia)
33	DF	GEO	Saba Mamatsashvili (on loan to Kalmar)
—	FW	IRQ	André Alsanati (on loan to (Iraq) Duhok, previously on loan at (Iraq) Al-Minaa)
—	DF	CPV	Kristopher Da Graca (free agent, previously on loan at (Switzerland) Schaffhausen)

=== Brommapojkarna ===
In:

No.	Pos.	Nation	Player
8	MF	SWE	Adam Stroud (from Oddevold)
20	MF	GUI	Issiaga Camara (on loan from (France) Nice, previously on loan at (France) Dijon)
28	DF	SWE	Isak Ssewankambo (free agent)
—	FW	SWE	Elton Hedström (from Hammarby TFF)

Out:

No.	Pos.	Nation	Player
8	FW	RSA	Liam Jordan (free agent)
9	FW	SWE	Nikola Vasić (to Hammarby)
13	DF	SWE	Emir El-Kathemi (on loan to (Finland) Mariehamn)
20	MF	EST	Martin Vetkal (to (Netherlands) Dordrecht)
77	DF	DEN	Frederik Christensen (on loan to (Germany) VfL Osnabrück)
—	FW	SWE	Elton Hedström (on loan to Hammarby TFF)
—	FW	SWE	Alexander Johansson (to Helsingborg, previously on loan at Utsikten)

=== Norrköping ===
In:

No.	Pos.	Nation	Player

Out:

No.	Pos.	Nation	Player
2	DF	GHA	Kojo Peprah Oppong (to (France) Nice)
15	FW	DEN	Sebastian Jørgensen (loan return to Malmö)
21	MF	GAM	Jesper Ceesay (to (Turkey) Antalyaspor)

=== Halmstad ===
In:

No.	Pos.	Nation	Player
24	DF	TUN	Rami Kaib (on loan from Elfsborg)
27	MF	FRA	Rocco Ascone (on loan from (Denmark) Nordsjælland)
99	FW	GHA	Emmanuel Yeboah (on loan from (Denmark) Brøndby, previously on loan at (Denmark) Vejle)

Out:

No.	Pos.	Nation	Player
7	FW	ISL	Birnir Snær Ingason (to (Iceland) KA)

=== Göteborg ===
In:

No.	Pos.	Nation	Player
11	FW	CMR	Saidou Alioum (from Hammarby, previously on loan at (Cyprus) Omonia)

Out:

No.	Pos.	Nation	Player
21	MF	SWE	Adam Carlén (to (Netherlands) Excelsior)
31	GK	SWE	David Mikhail (free agent)

=== Värnamo ===
In:

No.	Pos.	Nation	Player
8	MF	FIN	Otso Liimatta (on loan from (Portugal) Famalicão)
9	FW	FIN	Kai Meriluoto (from (Finland) HJK, previously on loan at (Slovenia) Maribor)
14	FW	SWE	Marcus Antonsson (from (Australia) Western Sydney Wanderers)
16	MF	SWE	Antonio Kujundžić (from Kalmar)
25	MF	SYR	Noah Shamoun (on loan from (Denmark) Randers)
27	DF	CIV	Souleymane Coulibaly (from (Ivory Coast) ASEC Mimosas)

Out:

No.	Pos.	Nation	Player
8	MF	RSA	Luke Le Roux (to (England) Portsmouth)
9	FW	NGA	Johnbosco Kalu (to (Israel) Beitar Jerusalem)
11	MF	BRA	Wenderson (to Elfsborg)
16	DF	SWE	Albin Lohikangas (free agent)
17	FW	SWE	Fred Bozicevic (on loan to Husqvarna)
26	MF	SWE	Calle Johansson (on loan to Rosengård)
27	DF	SWE	Johan Kenneryd (free agent)
32	MF	SWE	Kenan Bilalović (to (Scotland) Aberdeen)

=== Degerfors ===
In:

No.	Pos.	Nation	Player
6	DF	SWE	Daniel Sundgren (from (Greece) Volos)
19	FW	SWE	Richie Omorowa (on loan from (Turkey) Samsunspor)
26	GK	EST	Matvei Igonen (from (Bulgaria) Botev Plovdiv)
39	DF	CGO	Philippe Ndinga (from (France) Valenciennes B)
—	FW	DEN	Arman Taranis (from (Denmark) Roskilde)
—	DF	CAN	Marcus Godinho (from (Poland) Korona Kielce)

Out:

No.	Pos.	Nation	Player
17	MF	CIV	Luc Kassi (to (Iceland) Afturelding)
18	MF	SWE	Teo Grönborg (on loan to Umeå)
19	FW	PLE	Omar Faraj (loan return to (Egypt) Zamalek)
21	MF	SWE	Elias Pihlström (to (Switzerland) Lugano)
25	GK	SWE	Rasmus Forsell (on loan to Östersund)

=== Öster ===
In:

No.	Pos.	Nation	Player
3	DF	GHA	Kingsley Gyamfi (from Hammarby, previously on loan)
7	MF	FIN	Anssi Suhonen (on loan from (Germany) Hamburger SV, previously on loan at (Germany) Jahn Regensburg)
10	MF	SWE	Oscar Uddenäs (from (Netherlands) Excelsior, previously on loan at AIK)
24	MF	KOS	Patriot Sejdiu (on loan from Malmö, previously on loan at (Netherlands) Roda JC)
34	FW	SWE	Joel Voelkerling Persson (from (Italy) Lecce)

Out:

No.	Pos.	Nation	Player
7	MF	SWE	David Seger (to (Bulgaria) CSKA Sofia)
10	MF	SWE	Albin Mörfelt (to Östersund)
17	FW	SWE	Vincent Poppler (on loan to Oddevold)
25	FW	GAM	Youssoupha Sanyang (to (Czech Republic) Slavia Prague)

== Superettan ==
Note: Flags indicate national team as has been defined under FIFA eligibility rules. Players may hold more than one non-FIFA nationality.

=== Kalmar ===
In:

No.	Pos.	Nation	Player
14	MF	CIV	Awaka Djoro (from (Ivory Coast) ASEC Mimosas, previously on loan)
33	DF	GEO	Saba Mamatsashvili (on loan from Sirius)
37	MF	LTU	Tomas Kalinauskas (on loan from (England) Burton Albion)
70	FW	DEN	Emeka Nnamani (from (Denmark) B.93)

Out:

No.	Pos.	Nation	Player
18	MF	SWE	Antonio Kujundžić (to Värnamo)

=== Västerås ===
In:

No.	Pos.	Nation	Player
4	DF	SWE	Philip Bonde (from Östersund)
27	FW	SEN	Moussa Diallo (from (Senegal) Wally Daan)

Out:

No.	Pos.	Nation	Player
3	DF	NOR	Liiban Abadid (on loan to Utsikten)
4	DF	SWE	Ümit Aras (to Gefle)
13	MF	SWE	Hugo Engström (on loan to Trelleborg)
27	FW	CMR	Aaron Bibout (to (Belgium) Genk)
29	DF	SWE	Alexander Warneryd (to (Norway) Tromsø)
33	DF	BRA	Bernardo Vilar (free agent)

=== Landskrona ===
In:

No.	Pos.	Nation	Player
17	MF	ALB	Gent Elezaj (from Hammarby, previously on loan at Hammarby TFF)
30	GK	SWE	Marcus Pettersson (from Malmö, previously on loan)

Out:

No.	Pos.	Nation	Player
17	DF	SWE	Ramy Al-Karkhi (free agent)
19	DF	SWE	Vincent Sundberg (free agent)
24	DF	SWE	Emil Lindman (to Lund)

=== Helsingborg ===
In:

No.	Pos.	Nation	Player
16	FW	SWE	Alexander Johansson (from Brommapojkarna, previously on loan at Utsikten)

Out:

No.	Pos.	Nation	Player
11	FW	DEN	Milan Rasmussen (on loan to (Denmark) HIK)
21	FW	FIN	Adrian Svanbäck (to Häcken)
27	DF	GAM	Ebrima Bajo (on loan to Rosengård)

=== Örgryte ===
In:

No.	Pos.	Nation	Player
17	FW	SWE	William Hofvander (on loan from AIK)
23	MF	NZL	Owen Parker-Price (from Torslanda)
25	DF	RSA	Waylon Renecke (on loan from (Denmark) Copenhagen U19)

Out:

No.	Pos.	Nation	Player
17	DF	GUI	Madiou Keita (loan return to (France) Auxerre B)

=== Sandviken ===
In:

No.	Pos.	Nation	Player
4	DF	SWE	Viggo van der Laan (from Trollhättan)
5	MF	SWE	Oskar Löfström (from Sollentuna)
11	FW	SWE	Karl Bohm (from Utsikten)
24	FW	NOR	Yabets Yaya (from (Norway) Brann II)

Out:

No.	Pos.	Nation	Player
4	DF	SWE	Olle Samuelsson (to Häcken)
5	DF	SWE	Taulant Parallangaj (to Eskilstuna)
11	FW	SWE	Oscar Sjöstrand (to (Netherlands) Cambuur)

=== Trelleborg ===
In:

No.	Pos.	Nation	Player
13	MF	SWE	Hugo Engström (on loan from Västerås)
14	MF	DEN	Angelo Nehmé (from (Denmark) Horsens, previously on loan at (Denmark) Næstved)
30	GK	SWE	Victor Astor (on loan from GAIS)
45	FW	DEN	Zean Dalügge (from (Denmark) Vendsyssel)

Out:

No.	Pos.	Nation	Player
4	DF	SWE	Abbe Rehn (on loan to IFK Trelleborg)
23	FW	SWE	Loke Mattsson (to (United States) Pittsburgh Panthers)

=== Brage ===
In:

No.	Pos.	Nation	Player

Out:

No.	Pos.	Nation	Player
7	MF	SWE	Emil Tot Wikström (on loan to Umeå)

=== Utsikten ===
In:

No.	Pos.	Nation	Player
7	MF	TOG	Adil Titi (from (Italy) Trento)
14	DF	NOR	Liiban Abadid (on loan from Västerås)
16	FW	SWE	Kalipha Jawla (on loan from Djurgården, previously on loan at Östersund)
44	DF	IRQ	Allan Mohideen (from (Iraq) Al-Karma)

Out:

No.	Pos.	Nation	Player
1	GK	POL	Jakub Ojrzyński (loan return to (England) Liverpool)
7	FW	SWE	Karl Bohm (to Sandviken)
16	FW	SWE	Alexander Johansson (loan return to Brommapojkarna)
19	FW	SWE	Johannes Selvén (to (Iceland) Vestri)
—	GK	SWE	Lukas Lehto (to Torslanda, previously on loan)

=== Varberg ===
In:

No.	Pos.	Nation	Player
51	FW	UGA	Calvin Kabuye (on loan from Mjällby)
—	MF	SWE	Zakaria Loukili (on loan from Malmö)

Out:

No.	Pos.	Nation	Player
22	DF	SWE	Leo Frigell Jansson (on loan to Umeå)
—	DF	SWE	Viggo Gustavsson (on loan to Trollhättan)

=== Örebro ===
In:

No.	Pos.	Nation	Player
12	MF	SWE	Dino Salihović (from (Spain) Valencia Mestalla)
14	MF	SWE	Ludvig Richtnér (on loan from Elfsborg)
21	MF	SYR	Simon Amin (from (Serbia) Radnički Niš)
75	GK	POL	Jakub Ojrzyński (from (England) Liverpool, previously on loan at Utsikten)
99	FW	IRQ	Ahmed Yasin (from (Iraq) Zakho)

Out:

No.	Pos.	Nation	Player
3	DF	SWE	Oskar Käck (on loan to Gefle)
8	MF	SWE	Aleksandar Azizovic (on loan to Vasalund)
14	MF	SWE	Hamse Shagaxle (on loan to Örebro Syrianska)
20	MF	SWE	Charlie Swartling (to BK Forward)
21	MF	SWE	Linus Alperud (to (Norway) Lillestrøm)
22	MF	IRQ	Lucas Shlimon (free agent)

=== Oddevold ===
In:

No.	Pos.	Nation	Player
13	MF	RWA	York Rafael (from (Egypt) ZED)
15	FW	SWE	Vincent Poppler (on loan from Öster)
22	MF	SWE	Albert Ejupi (free agent)

Out:

No.	Pos.	Nation	Player
13	MF	SWE	Adam Stroud (to Brommapojkarna)
15	FW	NOR	Adrian Rogulj (loan return to (Netherlands) Emmen)
—	DF	HKG	Alexander Jojo (to (China) Shanghai Port, previously on loan at (Hong Kong) Eastern)
—	FW	SWE	Ëndrim Salihi (to Grebbestad, previously on loan at Herrestad)

=== Sundsvall ===
In:

No.	Pos.	Nation	Player

Out:

No.	Pos.	Nation	Player
4	DF	SWE	Ludvig Svanberg (to Mjällby)
—	DF	SWE	Edvard Carrick (on loan to Team TG, previously on loan at Kubikenborg)
—	FW	SWE	Abdulahi Shino (on loan to Torslanda, previously on loan at Lucksta)

=== Östersund ===
In:

No.	Pos.	Nation	Player
14	FW	SWE	Jabir Abdihakim Ali (free agent)
25	FW	SMA	Chovanie Amatkarijo (on loan from GAIS)
26	MF	SWE	Albin Mörfelt (from Öster)
32	GK	SWE	Max Croon (on loan from Djurgården, previously on loan at Viggbyholm)
—	DF	SWE	Philip Rolke (on loan from Djurgården U19, previously on loan at (Denmark) Horsens U19)
—	GK	SWE	Rasmus Forsell (on loan from Degerfors)

Out:

No.	Pos.	Nation	Player
1	GK	ISL	Adam Ingi Benediktsson (to (Denmark) AB)
18	DF	SWE	Philip Bonde (to Västerås)
19	MF	SWE	Mohamed Bawa (loan return to GAIS)
21	FW	SWE	Edgar Navassardian (on loan to Rosengård)
25	FW	SWE	Kalipha Jawla (loan return to Djurgården)
32	GK	NOR	Frank Stople (loan return to (Norway) Strømsgodset)

=== Umeå ===
In:

No.	Pos.	Nation	Player
11	MF	SWE	Emil Tot Wikström (on loan from Brage)
18	MF	GHA	Gideon Yaw Yiriyon (from (Ghana) Cedar Stars Academy)
20	DF	SWE	Neo Lindén (from AIK U19)
23	DF	SWE	Leo Frigell Jansson (on loan from Varberg)
25	MF	SWE	Teo Grönborg (on loan from Degerfors)

Out:

No.	Pos.	Nation	Player
11	MF	SWE	Maximilian Dejene (to Haninge)
20	DF	SWE	Hassan Abdi Hassan (to Örebro Syrianska)
22	MF	SWE	Tintin Lindgren (on loan to Team TG)
29	FW	SWE	Hugo Lundqvist (to Karlskrona)
30	GK	SWE	Linus Remahl (on loan to Täfteå)

=== Falkenberg ===
In:

No.	Pos.	Nation	Player

Out:

No.	Pos.	Nation	Player
12	MF	SWE	Christoffer Carlsson (retired)

== See also ==
- 2025 Allsvenskan
- 2025 Superettan
