= List of Swedish football transfers summer 2026 =

This is a list of Swedish football transfers for the 2026 summer transfer window. Only transfers featuring Allsvenskan and Superettan are listed.

== Allsvenskan ==
Note: Flags indicate national team as has been defined under FIFA eligibility rules. Players may hold more than one non-FIFA nationality.

=== Mjällby ===
In:

No.	Pos.	Nation	Player
1	GK	NOR	Sebastian Hansen (from (Norway) Odd)
3	DF	FRO	Martin Agnarsson (from (Denmark) Aarhus Fremad)
6	MF	DEN	Mads Enggård (from (Norway) Molde, previously on loan at (Denmark) Vejle)
9	FW	TUN	Ali Youssef (on loan from (Cyprus) Apollon Limassol)
19	FW	GAM	Paul Colley (on loan from (The Gambia) Medina United)
21	FW	DEN	Villum Dalsgaard (from (Denmark) Nordsjælland, previously on loan at (Norway) Hødd)
26	DF	USA	Ian Hoffmann (on loan from (Poland) Lech Poznań, previously on loan at (Norway) HamKam)

Out:

No.	Pos.	Nation	Player
1	GK	SWE	Amar Dževlan (on loan to Nordic United)
3	DF	CMR	Christian Tchouante (on loan to (Serbia) Železničar Pančevo)
6	MF	SWE	Ludwig Malachowski Thorell (to (Switzerland) Basel)
15	FW	NOR	Bork Bang-Kittilsen (to (Denmark) Fredericia)
17	FW	SWE	Elliot Stroud (to (England) Hull City)
19	FW	GAM	Abdoulie Manneh (on loan to (Belgium) Cercle Brugge)
21	FW	NGR	Ibrahim Adewale (on loan to Norrby)
30	GK	SWE	Hugo Fagerberg (on loan to Norrköping)
31	FW	SWE	Zebedee Kennedy (to (Italy) Como Primavera)
—	MF	SWE	Kimmen Nennesson (on loan to Kristianstad, previously on loan at Enköping)

=== Hammarby ===
In:

No.	Pos.	Nation	Player
17	MF	SWE	Amin Boudri (from (United States) Los Angeles FC)
24	DF	RSA	Waylon Renecke (from (Denmark) Copenhagen youth, previously on loan at (Denmark) Esbjerg)

Out:

No.	Pos.	Nation	Player
14	MF	SWE	Dennis Collander (to GAIS)
19	FW	SWE	Nikola Vasić (to GAIS)
22	MF	SWE	Wilson Lindberg (to Häcken)
29	FW	BFA	Elohim Kaboré (on loan to (Belgium) Beveren)
—	MF	SWE	Keyano Marrah (on loan to Öster, previously on loan at Hammarby TFF)
—	FW	MNE	Viktor Đukanović (on loan to (Hungary) ETO Győr, previously on loan at (Slovakia) Dunajská Streda)
—	DF	JPN	Yusei Shima (to (Austria) Schwarz-Weiß Bregenz, previously on loan at Hammarby TFF)

=== GAIS ===
In:

No.	Pos.	Nation	Player
14	FW	DEN	Simon Jørgensen (from (Faroe Islands) Skála)
19	MF	SWE	Christos Gravius (free agent)
21	FW	SWE	Nikola Vasić (from Hammarby)
34	MF	SWE	Dennis Collander (from Hammarby)

Out:

No.	Pos.	Nation	Player
13	GK	NZL	Kees Sims (on loan to (Norway) Haugesund)
21	FW	SWE	Shalom Ekong (on loan to Sundsvall)
29	FW	SWE	Daniel Bengtsson (on loan to Utsikten)
30	GK	SWE	Alvin Didriksson (on loan to Hestrafors)
—	FW	SWE	Simon Sjöholm (reloan to Utsikten)
—	FW	CIV	Ibrahim Diabate (on loan to (Turkey) Erzurumspor, previously on loan at (Spain) Deportivo Alavés)

=== Göteborg ===
In:

No.	Pos.	Nation	Player
4	MF	SWE	Kevin Ackermann (from Brommapojkarna)
6	DF	ISL	Hjörtur Hermannsson (from (Greece) Volos)
7	FW	DEN	Alexander Simmelhack (from (Denmark) Silkeborg)
8	MF	SWE	Sam Larsson (from (Turkey) Fatih Karagümrük)
11	FW	SLO	Nino Žugelj (on loan from Djurgården)
28	DF	GHA	Issaka Seidu (on loan from (Denmark) Nordsjælland, previously on loan at Ljungskile)
—	MF	NGR	Ifeoluwa Owoloporoku (from (Nigeria) Triple 44)
—	FW	SSD	Peter Lazarus (from (South Sudan) Future Stars Academy)

Out:

No.	Pos.	Nation	Player
4	DF	GHA	Rockson Yeboah (to (Spain) Osasuna)
7	FW	TOG	Sebastian Clemmensen (to (Portugal) Rio Ave)
8	MF	SWE	Imam Jagne (on loan to (Greece) Kifisia)
11	FW	CMR	Saidou Alioum (to (Czech Republic) Jablonec)
16	MF	SWE	Filip Ottosson (on loan to (Norway) Lillestrøm)
26	MF	SWE	Benjamin Brantlind (to (France) Strasbourg)
28	MF	SWE	Lucas Kåhed (to Varberg)
34	GK	SWE	Fredrik Andersson (free agent)

=== Djurgården ===
In:

No.	Pos.	Nation	Player
7	MF	GRE	Christos Almyras (from (Greece) Asteras Tripolis)
10	FW	ENG	Abdul Abdulmalik (from (England) Boreham Wood)
14	FW	SWE	Charlie Rosenqvist (from Kalmar)
25	DF	GER	Daryl Tschoumy-Nana (from (Germany) VfL Bochum youth)
26	FW	NGR	Angelo Agbejoye (from (Nigeria) Grassrunners)
27	FW	NOR	Sander Ringberg (from (Norway) Hønefoss)
29	MF	SWE	Alexander Johansson (from Stocksund)
30	GK	SWE	Lukas Jonsson (from (Germany) VfL Osnabrück)
—	DF	BRA	Lucca Gentil (from (Brazil) Sfera)

Out:

No.	Pos.	Nation	Player
3	DF	SWE	Leon Hien (on loan to (Norway) Tromsø)
10	MF	ISL	Mikael Anderson (to (Denmark) AGF)
14	MF	SWE	Hampus Finndell (to (Poland) Jagiellonia Białystok)
17	MF	SWE	Ahmed Saeed (on loan to FC Stockholm)
23	FW	SLO	Nino Žugelj (on loan to Göteborg)
29	FW	FIN	Santeri Haarala (to (Finland) HJK)
37	DF	SWE	Carl Selfvén (on loan to Stocksund)
38	MF	SWE	Milian Jansson (on loan to Karlberg)
45	GK	SRB	Filip Manojlović (on loan to (Norway) Start)
—	MF	SWE	Vincent Larsson (on loan to Enskede)
—	MF	SWE	Abdirahim Abdulle (on loan to Järfälla)
—	MF	SWE	Ahmed Saeed (on loan to Arlanda, previously on loan at FC Stockholm)
—	FW	SWE	Kalipha Jawla (on loan to Öster, previously on loan at Nordic United)
—	DF	SWE	Viktor Bergh (to (Germany) Karlsruher SC, previously on loan at (Germany) Hansa Rostock)
—	FW	SWE	Zakaria Sawo (to (Azerbaijan) Qarabağ, previously on loan at (Cyprus) AEL Limassol)

=== Malmö ===
In:

No.	Pos.	Nation	Player
2	DF	NOR	Stian Gregersen (from (United States) Atlanta United)
9	FW	ESP	Diego García (from (Spain) Leganés)
14	DF	NOR	Warren Kamanzi (from (France) Toulouse)
15	FW	SWE	Mayckel Lahdo (from (Netherlands) AZ, previously on loan at (Denmark) Brøndby)

Out:

No.	Pos.	Nation	Player
2	DF	SWE	Johan Karlsson (to (Denmark) Vejle)
8	MF	ISL	Arnór Sigurðsson (to (Greece) Kalamata)
19	DF	NOR	Colin Rösler (to (Denmark) AGF)
20	FW	NOR	Erik Botheim (to (Norway) Viking)
21	FW	SWE	Stefano Vecchia (free agent)
22	MF	SWE	Taha Ali (to (Greece) PAOK)
30	GK	BRA	Ricardo Friedrich (free agent)
—	DF	NEP	Sashwat Rana (on loan to (Denmark) HIK, previously on loan at Olympic)
—	MF	GUI	Salifou Soumah (on loan to (Greece) Panetolikos, previously on loan at (Poland) Radomiak Radom)
—	MF	SWE	Hugo Bolin (to (Germany) Borussia Mönchengladbach, previously on loan)
—	FW	DEN	Sebastian Jørgensen (to (Denmark) AGF, previously on loan)

=== AIK ===
In:

No.	Pos.	Nation	Player
3	DF	BEL	Hervé Matthys (from (Poland) Motor Lublin)
9	FW	SWE	Linus Carlstrand (from Öster)
10	MF	CHI	Lucas Assadi (from Universidad de Chile)
20	DF	DEN	Sebastian Hausner (on loan from (Denmark) Horsens)
33	DF	FIN	Diogo Tomás (from (Netherlands) ADO Den Haag)
—	MF	SWE	Robin Krügel (from Sirius youth)
—	MF	GHA	Nana-Kofi Donkor (from (Georgia (country)) Dila Gori, previously on loan at (Georgia (country)) Dinamo Tbilisi)

Out:

No.	Pos.	Nation	Player
9	FW	NOR	Erik Flataker (to (Netherlands) Go Ahead Eagles)
10	MF	KOS	Bersant Celina (to (Saudi Arabia) Al-Ettifaq)
11	MF	SWE	Victor Andersson (to (Portugal) Vitória de Guimarães)
33	MF	HUN	Áron Csongvai (to (France) Saint-Étienne)
36	MF	NGR	Zadok Yohanna (to (England) Brighton & Hove Albion)
37	DF	SYR	Ahmad Faqa (to Degerfors)
—	FW	KEN	Henry Atola (free agent)
—	FW	CYP	Andronikos Kakoullis (to (Cyprus) Aris Limassol, previously on loan)

=== Elfsborg ===
In:

No.	Pos.	Nation	Player
2	DF	SWE	Viggo Elfström (from Arlanda)
3	DF	ENG	Jonathan Esenga (from (England) Fulham youth)
5	MF	SWE	Ossian Nordvall (from (Italy) Bologna Primavera)
7	MF	SWE	Marcus Rohdén (from (Cyprus) AEK Larnaca)
12	GK	DEN	Theo Sander (from (Denmark) Copenhagen, previously on loan at (Denmark) OB)
16	DF	DEN	Alexander Jensen (from (Scotland) Aberdeen)
27	MF	NGR	Abdulmuiz Oladimeji (from (Nigeria) Remo Stars youth)

Out:

No.	Pos.	Nation	Player
1	GK	SWE	Tim Erlandsson (on loan to (Norway) Odd)
2	DF	GHA	Rufai Mohammed (on loan to (Italy) Venezia)
16	MF	FIN	Altti Hellemaa (on loan to (Finland) Jaro)
20	MF	SWE	Gottfrid Rapp (on loan to (Norway) Stabæk)
24	FW	DEN	Frederik Ihler (on loan to (Netherlands) Volendam)
26	DF	SWE	Ludvig Richtnér (on loan to (Finland) Mariehamn)
27	MF	NGR	Victor Okeke (on loan to Brage)
28	DF	SWE	Frode Aronsson (to (Denmark) Esbjerg)
29	DF	NGR	Ibrahim Buhari (to Austria Wien)
—	FW	DEN	Emil Holten (to (Germany) Hansa Rostock, previously on loan)

=== Sirius ===
In:

No.	Pos.	Nation	Player
9	FW	NED	Jesper Uneken (from (Netherlands) Jong PSV, previously on loan at (Netherlands) RKC Waalwijk)
16	MF	FIN	Otso Liimatta (from (Portugal) Famalicão, previously on loan at Halmstad)
29	FW	SWE	Åke Andersson (from Norrköping)
30	FW	HUN	Zalán Vancsa (from (Belgium) Lommel)

Out:

No.	Pos.	Nation	Player
3	DF	UKR	Bohdan Milovanov (on loan to (Finland) Gnistan)
9	FW	SCO	Robbie Ure (to (Spain) Sevilla)
19	FW	SWE	Noel Milleskog (on loan to Degerfors)
23	FW	SCO	Finlay Neat (on loan to Norrby)
26	MF	SWE	Hugo Mella (on loan to Värnamo)
27	DF	SWE	Ben Magnusson (on loan to Stocksund)
39	GK	SWE	Villy Strindlund Larsen (on loan to Stocksund)
—	MF	SWE	August Ljungberg (on loan to Värnamo, previously on loan at (Norway) Egersund)
—	MF	FIN	Leo Walta (to (Wales) Swansea City, previously on loan)
—	FW	IRQ	André Alsanati (to (Iraq) Mosul, previously on loan at (Iraq) Duhok)

=== Häcken ===
In:

No.	Pos.	Nation	Player
8	MF	NOR	Simen Hestnes (from (Norway) KFUM)
14	MF	NOR	Markus Haaland (on loan from (Norway) Brann)
18	MF	SWE	Wilson Lindberg (from Hammarby)
29	FW	DEN	Mads Agger (on loan from (Poland) Pogoń Szczecin)
32	MF	SWE	Harun Ibrahim (on loan from (United Arab Emirates) Sharjah)
—	MF	SWE	Efdon Mahari (from (France) Reims youth)

Out:

No.	Pos.	Nation	Player
3	DF	SWE	Johan Hammar (to Örgryte)
7	MF	DEN	Sanders Ngabo (on loan to (Denmark) Lyngby)
8	MF	DEN	Silas Andersen (to (Portugal) Sporting)
14	FW	SWE	Jeremy Agbonifo (loan return to (France) Lens)
16	MF	SWE	Pontus Dahbo (on loan to (Netherlands) Vitesse)
18	MF	IRQ	Danilo Al-Saed (on loan to (Norway) HamKam)
24	FW	TUN	Amor Layouni (to (Cyprus) AEK Larnaca)
—	MF	SWE	Efdon Mahari (on loan to AFC Eskilstuna)
—	DF	SRB	Nikola Zečević (on loan to (Serbia) Radnički Niš, previously on loan at (Serbia) Železničar Pančevo)
—	DF	NOR	Marius Lode (to (Norway) Sarpsborg, previously on loan at (Australia) Brisbane Roar)
—	FW	SRB	Srđan Hrstić (to (Austria) SCR Altach, previously on loan)
—	FW	CIV	Severin Nioule (to (Belgium) Charleroi, previously on loan at Varberg)

=== Halmstad ===
In:

No.	Pos.	Nation	Player
23	FW	SWE	Ajdin Zeljković (from (Kazakhstan) Aktobe)
28	MF	GER	Tom Trybull (from (Denmark) OB)

Out:

No.	Pos.	Nation	Player
15	DF	SWE	Gustav Friberg (to (Denmark) Kolding)
20	MF	FIN	Otso Liimatta (loan return to (Portugal) Famalicão)
38	GK	DEN	William Lykke (loan return to (Denmark) Nordsjælland)
99	FW	GHA	Emmanuel Yeboah (loan return to (Denmark) Brøndby)
—	GK	SWE	Zackarias Nilsson (to Ängelholm, previously on loan at Astrio)

=== Brommapojkarna ===
In:

No.	Pos.	Nation	Player
2	DF	SWE	Pavle Vagić (from (China) Liaoning Tieren)
12	FW	NGR	Bidemi Amole (from (Nigeria) Real Sapphire, previously on loan)
16	FW	CRO	Luka Petrović (from (Spain) Real Sociedad youth)
24	MF	TUN	Wael Derbali (from (Tunisia) Espérance de Tunis)
—	FW	DEN	Abdul Daramy (on loan from (Denmark) Copenhagen youth)
—	FW	SWE	Carlos Jacinto (from Franke)

Out:

No.	Pos.	Nation	Player
2	DF	ISL	Hlynur Freyr Karlsson (on loan to (Iceland) Breiðablik)
4	DF	SWE	Oskar Cotton (on loan to Oddevold)
18	FW	SWE	Elton Hedström (on loan to Ljungskile)
20	MF	GUI	Issiaga Camara (loan return to (France) Nice)
21	DF	SWE	Alex Timossi Andersson (to (Poland) Śląsk Wrocław)
24	MF	SWE	Kevin Ackermann (to Göteborg)
33	FW	SWE	Sion Oppong (to (France) Toulouse)
—	FW	SWE	Carlos Jacinto (on loan to Nacka)
—	DF	DEN	Frederik Christensen (to (Germany) MSV Duisburg, previously on loan at (Germany) VfL Osnabrück)

=== Degerfors ===
In:

No.	Pos.	Nation	Player
2	DF	SYR	Ahmad Faqa (from AIK)
3	DF	NOR	Nikolai Skuseth (on loan from (Norway) Sarpsborg 08, previously on loan at (Norway) Kristiansund)
9	FW	FRA	Karim Boutera (from (France) Boulogne B)
10	FW	SWE	Noel Milleskog (on loan from Sirius)
13	MF	GHA	Yiriyon Gideon (from (Ghana) Inter Allies, previously on loan)
23	MF	SWE	Robin Dzabic (on loan from (Norway) Sandefjord)

Out:

No.	Pos.	Nation	Player
2	DF	GUI	Mamadouba Diaby (to (Spain) Juventud Torremolinos)
10	MF	SWE	Marcus Rafferty (to (Turkey) Kasımpaşa)
12	DF	SWE	Erik Lindell (to Helsingborg)
19	MF	SWE	Alexander Lindgren (on loan to Nordic United)
21	MF	SWE	Alexander Berisson (on loan to Karlslund)
24	FW	SWE	Olle Leonardsson (on loan to FC Stockholm)
25	GK	SWE	Rasmus Forsell (to Östersund)
27	FW	GHA	Ziyad Salifu (on loan to Rosengård)

=== Västerås ===
In:

No.	Pos.	Nation	Player
9	FW	DEN	Casper Risbjerg (from (Denmark) B.93)
16	FW	CGO	Bonaventure Lendambi (from (Nigeria) Grassrunners, previously on loan at (Austria) SW Bregenz)
23	DF	SWE	Peter Amoran (from (Italy) Parma, previously on loan at (Italy) Cesena)
28	DF	GUI	Madiou Keita (from (Belgium) RWDM Brussels)

Out:

No.	Pos.	Nation	Player
9	FW	DEN	Mikkel Ladefoged (to (England) Lincoln City)
23	MF	SWE	Lucas Sibelius (on loan to Varberg)
37	MF	SWE	Musab Abdi Mohamud (on loan to Enköping)
—	DF	NOR	Liiban Abadid (to Nordic United, previously on loan)

=== Kalmar ===
In:

No.	Pos.	Nation	Player
4	DF	SWE	Jesper Löfgren (on loan from (Switzerland) Luzern)
11	MF	FIN	Kasper Paananen (on loan from (Finland) SJK)
13	MF	GAM	Amara Camara (from (The Gambia) Real de Banjul)
19	FW	DEN	Eskild Dall (from (Denmark) Fredericia)
20	DF	SWE	Alexander Almqvist (from Oddevold)
22	MF	DEN	Tobias Lauritsen (from (Denmark) Vejle)
25	FW	SYR	Noah Shamoun (on loan from (Denmark) Randers, previously on loan at Värnamo)
26	DF	FIN	Miska Ylitolva (on loan from (Finland) HJK)

Out:

No.	Pos.	Nation	Player
4	DF	FIN	Rony Jansson (to (Germany) FC St. Pauli)
6	MF	SWE	Vilmer Tyrén (on loan to Ljungskile)
11	FW	FIN	Anthony Olusanya (to (Republic of Ireland) St Patrick's Athletic)
12	DF	SWE	Zakarias Råvik (on loan to Värnamo)
13	FW	SWE	Charlie Rosenqvist (to Djurgården)
20	DF	MAR	Achraf Dari (loan return to (Egypt) Al Ahly)
28	FW	SOM	Abdi Sabriye (on loan to (Finland) Jaro)

=== Örgryte ===
In:

No.	Pos.	Nation	Player
11	MF	ENG	David Obou (from (England) Crystal Palace youth)
18	DF	SWE	Adam Andersson (from (Denmark) AaB)
25	DF	SWE	Johan Hammar (from Häcken)
32	FW	SWE	Viktor Ekblom (on loan from (Norway) Tromsø)

Out:

No.	Pos.	Nation	Player
11	FW	SWE	Noah Christoffersson (to (Switzerland) Thun)
25	MF	SWE	Demirel Hodžić (loan return to (Italy) Milan Futuro)
26	DF	SWE	Love Kyhlén (on loan to Qviding)
—	DF	SWE	Carl Millard Javette (on loan to Jonsered, previously on loan at Gefle)
—	FW	SWE	Philip Bergqvist (on loan to Jonsered, previously on loan at Torslanda)

== Superettan ==
Note: Flags indicate national team as has been defined under FIFA eligibility rules. Players may hold more than one non-FIFA nationality.

=== Norrköping ===
In:

No.	Pos.	Nation	Player
40	GK	SWE	Hugo Fagerberg (on loan from Mjällby)

Out:

No.	Pos.	Nation	Player
2	DF	NGR	Victor Romanus (free agent)
17	DF	GAM	Abdoulie Tamba (on loan to (Finland) TPS)
28	FW	SWE	Åke Andersson (to Sirius)

=== Öster ===
In:

No.	Pos.	Nation	Player
9	FW	SWE	Kalipha Jawla (on loan from Djurgården, previously on loan at Nordic United)
15	DF	FIN	Tatu Varmanen (free agent)
18	MF	SWE	Keyano Marrah (on loan from Hammarby, previously on loan at Hammarby TFF)
29	MF	DEN	Marinus Due Grandt (from (Denmark) Hillerød)
34	FW	SWE	William Thellsson (on loan from Sandviken)

Out:

No.	Pos.	Nation	Player
2	DF	FIN	Aapo Mäenpää (on loan to (Finland) Haka)
9	FW	SWE	Linus Carlstrand (to AIK)
18	FW	GAM	Musa Njie (on loan to Umeå)
20	DF	GAM	Musa Jatta (to (Norway) Tromsø)
24	MF	SWE	Al-Hussein Shakir (on loan to Umeå)
29	MF	SWE	Karl Wendt (loan return to (Poland) Lechia Gdańsk)

=== Värnamo ===
In:

No.	Pos.	Nation	Player
8	MF	SWE	Hugo Mella (on loan from Sirius)
10	FW	SWE	Viktor Claesson (from (Denmark) Copenhagen)
11	MF	SWE	August Ljungberg (on loan from Sirius, previously on loan at (Norway) Egersund)
16	DF	SWE	Zakarias Råvik (on loan from Kalmar)
18	DF	SWE	Arash Motaraghebjafarpour (free agent)
33	FW	NGR	Musa Akinfenwa (on loan from (Nigeria) Real Sapphire)
39	GK	SWE	Liam Selin (on loan from (Denmark) Midtjylland)

Out:

No.	Pos.	Nation	Player
11	FW	SYR	Noah Shamoun (loan return to (Denmark) Randers)
15	DF	CIV	Souleymane Coulibaly (to (Israel) Hapoel Acre)
16	MF	SWE	Antonio Kujundžić (free agent)
19	DF	SWE	Erik Freij (on loan to Husqvarna)
39	GK	POL	Błażej Sapielak (free agent)

=== Oddevold ===
In:

No.	Pos.	Nation	Player
9	FW	FIN	Rudi Vikström (from (Finland) Jaro)
21	DF	SWE	Oliver Thoreson (from Göteborg youth)
22	DF	SWE	Oskar Cotton (on loan from Brommapojkarna)
23	FW	KOS	Aulon Bitiqi (on loan from Varberg)
26	MF	SWE	Freddie Lantz (on loan from Göteborg youth, previously on loan at Utsikten)

Out:

No.	Pos.	Nation	Player
1	GK	SWE	Armin Ibrahimović (to Trollhättan)
9	FW	SWE	Linus Tornblad (to Gauthiod)
21	DF	SWE	Alexander Almqvist (to Kalmar)
22	DF	SWE	Johan Albin (to (Slovakia) Žilina)
23	MF	SWE	Riane Haidar (on loan to Vänersborg)

=== Falkenberg ===
In:

No.	Pos.	Nation	Player
12	DF	SWE	Ayo Rupia-Ellis (from Karlberg)

Out:

No.	Pos.	Nation	Player
34	GK	SWE	Oscar Linnér (free agent)

=== Varberg ===
In:

No.	Pos.	Nation	Player
9	FW	ALB	Laorent Shabani (from (Kosovo) Ballkani)
12	MF	SWE	Lucas Kåhed (from Göteborg)
23	MF	SWE	Lucas Sibelius (on loan from Västerås)

Out:

No.	Pos.	Nation	Player
6	MF	SWE	Oliver Silverholt (to (Gibraltar) Europa Point)
9	FW	KOS	Aulon Bitiqi (on loan to Oddevold)
12	FW	CIV	Severin Nioule (loan return to Häcken)
—	MF	SWE	Nils Salomonsson Önnebo (on loan to Laholm, previously on loan at Ängelholm)
—	DF	SWE	Arvid Wiklund (to Ängelholm, previously on loan at Utsikten)

=== Helsingborg ===
In:

No.	Pos.	Nation	Player
8	FW	SOM	Osman Addo (on loan from (Denmark) Viborg)
16	FW	IRQ	Amin Al-Hamawi (on loan from (Denmark) Randers)
21	FW	SWE	Julian Larsson (from (England) Burton Albion)
31	DF	SWE	Erik Lindell (from Degerfors)

Out:

No.	Pos.	Nation	Player
8	MF	SWE	Ervin Gigović (to (Norway) Sandefjord)
18	FW	SWE	Casper Ljung Hofvendahl (on loan to Eskilsminne)
23	DF	SWE	William Westerlund (on loan to Eskilsminne)
29	FW	NED	Kevin Appiah Nyarko (to (Romania) Politehnica Timișoara)
31	MF	SWE	Alvin Nordin (to (Netherlands) Groningen)

=== Brage ===
In:

No.	Pos.	Nation	Player
7	MF	SWE	Jacob Stensson (from (Iceland) Vestri)
16	MF	RWA	York Rafael (from (South Korea) Anyang)
19	FW	DEN	Mass Sise (from (Serbia) Javor Matis)
20	MF	NGR	Victor Okeke (on loan from Elfsborg)

Out:

No.	Pos.	Nation	Player
7	MF	DEN	Marinus Larsen (to (Denmark) Næstved)
19	MF	SWE	Haris Brkić (free agent)
20	FW	SWE	Gustav Nordh (to (Norway) Lillestrøm)

=== Landskrona ===
In:

No.	Pos.	Nation	Player
14	FW	DEN	Mathias Andreasen (from (Denmark) Næstved)
27	FW	DEN	Roni Arabaci (from (Denmark) B.93)
—	MF	SWE	Linus Braun (from Hässleholm)

Out:

No.	Pos.	Nation	Player
11	MF	SWE	Markus Björkqvist (on loan to AFC Malmö)
17	MF	ALB	Gent Elezaj (on loan to Hammarby TFF)
19	FW	NGR	Maxwell Ozoemena (loan return to (Nigeria) Sparkling Stars)
20	FW	KEN	Xavier Odhiambo (on loan to (Finland) VPS)
22	FW	SWE	Christian Stark (on loan to Eskilsminne)
—	MF	SWE	Linus Braun (on loan to Hässleholm)

=== Sandviken ===
In:

No.	Pos.	Nation	Player
17	DF	SWE	Wilhelm Nilsson (from (Denmark) B.93)
18	DF	USA	Chris Rogers (from (United States) Columbus Crew 2)
20	FW	FIN	Nicholas Vainio (from Karlberg)
22	MF	SWE	Daniel Bergman (from Ängelholm)

Out:

No.	Pos.	Nation	Player
9	FW	SWE	William Thellsson (on loan to Öster)
25	DF	CIV	Valassina Diomande (to (Denmark) Horsens)

=== Sundsvall ===
In:

No.	Pos.	Nation	Player
8	FW	SWE	Carl Björk (from (Denmark) Brøndby, previously on loan at (Denmark) B.93)
14	MF	SWE	Alper Demirol (from (Turkey) Vanspor)
15	FW	SWE	Shalom Ekong (on loan from GAIS)
19	MF	ALB	Eron Gojani (on loan from (Norway) HamKam)
21	MF	SWE	Ludvig Nåvik (from (Norway) Strømmen)

Out:

No.	Pos.	Nation	Player
2	DF	SWE	Alexandros Pantelidis (to Haninge)
15	FW	GAM	Suwaibou Kebbeh (loan return to Hammarby)
19	MF	SWE	Yacqub Finey (to (Netherlands) Excelsior)
21	FW	SWE	Kawa Mazen (on loan to Piteå)
—	DF	FRA	Randy Obam (to (Belgium) Crossing Schaerbeek, previously on loan at Fränsta)

=== Östersund ===
In:

No.	Pos.	Nation	Player
6	MF	ESP	José Masllorens (from (Colombia) Inter Bogotá, previously on loan at (Spain) Unionistas de Salamanca)
12	GK	SWE	Rasmus Forsell (from Degerfors)
22	FW	SWE	Jabir Abdihakim Ali (from (Finland) VPS)

Out:

No.	Pos.	Nation	Player
11	FW	ARM	Edgar Navassardian (on loan to FBK Karlstad)
20	MF	NGR	Michael Oluwayemi (on loan to FBK Karlstad)
23	DF	SWE	Ali Suljić (to (Norway) Egersund)

=== Örebro ===
In:

No.	Pos.	Nation	Player
10	FW	SWE	Rasmus Wiedesheim-Paul (from (Netherlands) Roda JC)
19	DF	KOS	Jetmir Haliti (free agent)
20	DF	SWE	Max Watson (from (Poland) Ruch Chorzów)
23	MF	MKD	Erdal Rakip (from (Poland) Miedź Legnica)
25	FW	SMA	Chovanie Amatkarijo (from (Latvia) Liepāja)

Out:

No.	Pos.	Nation	Player
18	FW	SWE	Erman Hrastovina (on loan to Umeå)
23	FW	SWE	Kim Dickson (on loan to AFC Malmö)
24	MF	SYR	Wessam Dukhan (to FBK Karlstad)

=== Nordic United ===
In:

No.	Pos.	Nation	Player
4	DF	NOR	Liiban Abadid (from Västerås, previously on loan)
10	MF	SWE	Eliaz Durmaz (from (Turkey) Eskişehirspor)
12	DF	SWE	Sammi Davis (from (Norway) Egersund)
17	MF	SWE	Alexander Lindgren (on loan from Degerfors)
40	GK	SWE	Amar Dževlan (on loan from Mjällby)

Out:

No.	Pos.	Nation	Player
1	GK	SWE	Angelo Melkemichel (on loan to Haninge)
9	FW	POL	Kamil Dawid Dudziak (to (Moldova) Milsami)
10	FW	SWE	Lorent Mehmeti (to (Slovakia) Spartak Trnava)
12	MF	SWE	Jake Larsson (free agent)
17	FW	SWE	Kalipha Jawla (loan return to Djurgården)
22	MF	SWE	Niklas Söderberg (to Rosengård)
27	DF	SWE	David Tokpah (to FC Stockholm)
—	FW	SWE	Philip Yarar (to Fittja, previously on loan at Nacka)

=== Ljungskille ===
In:

No.	Pos.	Nation	Player
8	MF	SWE	Vilmer Tyrén (on loan from Kalmar)
19	FW	SWE	Elton Hedström (on loan from Brommapojkarna)
—	DF	BRA	Mateus Lyrio (from (Brazil) Concórdia youth)

Out:

No.	Pos.	Nation	Player
4	DF	GHA	Issaka Seidu (loan return to (Denmark) Nordsjælland)
8	MF	NOR	Magnus Solheim (to (Norway) Kjelsås)

=== Norrby ===
In:

No.	Pos.	Nation	Player
13	FW	NGR	Ibrahim Adewale (on loan from Mjällby)
15	FW	POR	Elói Ferreira (from (Portugal) Leixões youth)
19	FW	SCO	Finlay Neat (on loan from Sirius)
28	FW	SWE	Hugo Tilly (from Trollhättan)

Out:

No.	Pos.	Nation	Player
13	FW	SWE	Liam Björninger (on loan to Olympic)
23	GK	SWE	Albin Neziri (on loan to Qviding)

== See also ==
- 2026 Allsvenskan
- 2026 Superettan
