= Ulf Kristiansson =

Swedish football manager (born 1983)

Personal information
- Date of birth: 5 June 1983 (age 43)

Team information
- Current team: IF Brommapojkarna (manager)

Youth career
- IFK Vaxholm

Senior career*
Years	Team	Apps	(Gls)
2001–2003	AIK (youth)		
2003–2004	Hammarby IF (youth)		
2004–2006	BK Forward (youth)		
2006–2007	Stene IF		
2011–2013	Sweden U19 women (assistant)		
2013–2015	AIK (assistant)		
2017–2018	Sweden U15–U17 women		
2018–2020	Sweden U23 women		
2021	Örebro SK (assistant)		
2021	Hammarby TFF		
2022–2023	Vittsjö GIK women		
2024	IF Brommapojkarna (assistant)		
2025–	IF Brommapojkarna		
- * Club domestic league appearances and goals

Ulf Kristiansson (born 5 June 1983) is a Swedish football manager who currently manages IF Brommapojkarna.

== Career ==
Kristiansson played youth football in IFK Vaxholm, but never had a playing career, turning to management already at age 18, in 2001. He coached youth teams in AIK, Hammarby IF and BK Forward before taking his first senior coaching position at Stene IF in 2006.

In 2007 he was brought on as a football match analyst by Örebro SK, with whom he was affiliated for that year, and the Swedish Football Association, where he stayed longer. Ahead of the 2010 FIFA World Cup, he was brought on as a match analyst for the Nigeria national football team under the Swedish manager Lars Lagerbäck.

Returning to the Swedish Football Federation, in 2011 he got his first coaching position there, as assistant manager of Sweden U19 women under Calle Barrling. They managed to win the 2012 UEFA Women's Under-19 Championship. In 2013, Kristiansson moved on to AIK as assistant manager, before returning to the federation in 2016 as manager of Sweden U15–U17 women. From 2018 he managed Sweden U23 women as well as the Future Team, a "shadow" national team for mid-teen boys who are perceived to be talents, but less physically developed than the best players their age. During this time with the federation, Kristiansson was also an analyst for Sweden's women's team at the 2016 Summer Olympics, the 2017 UEFA Women's Championship and the 2019 FIFA Women's World Cup.

In 2021, Kristiansson once again went back to assistant manager for a men's Allsvenskan side, this time Örebro. However, he left before the season was over, in order to take the reins at Hammarby TFF. Having helped them survive relegation from the 2021 Ettan, he was recruited for his first managerial position in the Damallsvenskan, at Vittsjö GIK. He was co-manager with Tomas Mårtensson.

In 2024, he moved back to Stockholm as U19 manager of IF Brommapojkarna. Already after one year, the senior team needed a new manager following the departure of Olof Mellberg and Andreas Engelmark, and Kristiansson was chosen as co-manager with Fredrik Landén. In their first year as managers, the team placed 12th of 16.

== Personal life ==
He is married and has children, currently residing in Åkersberga. He had a residence near Hästveda when coaching Vittsjö.
