= Tijjani Mohammed =

Nigerian footballer (born 2006)

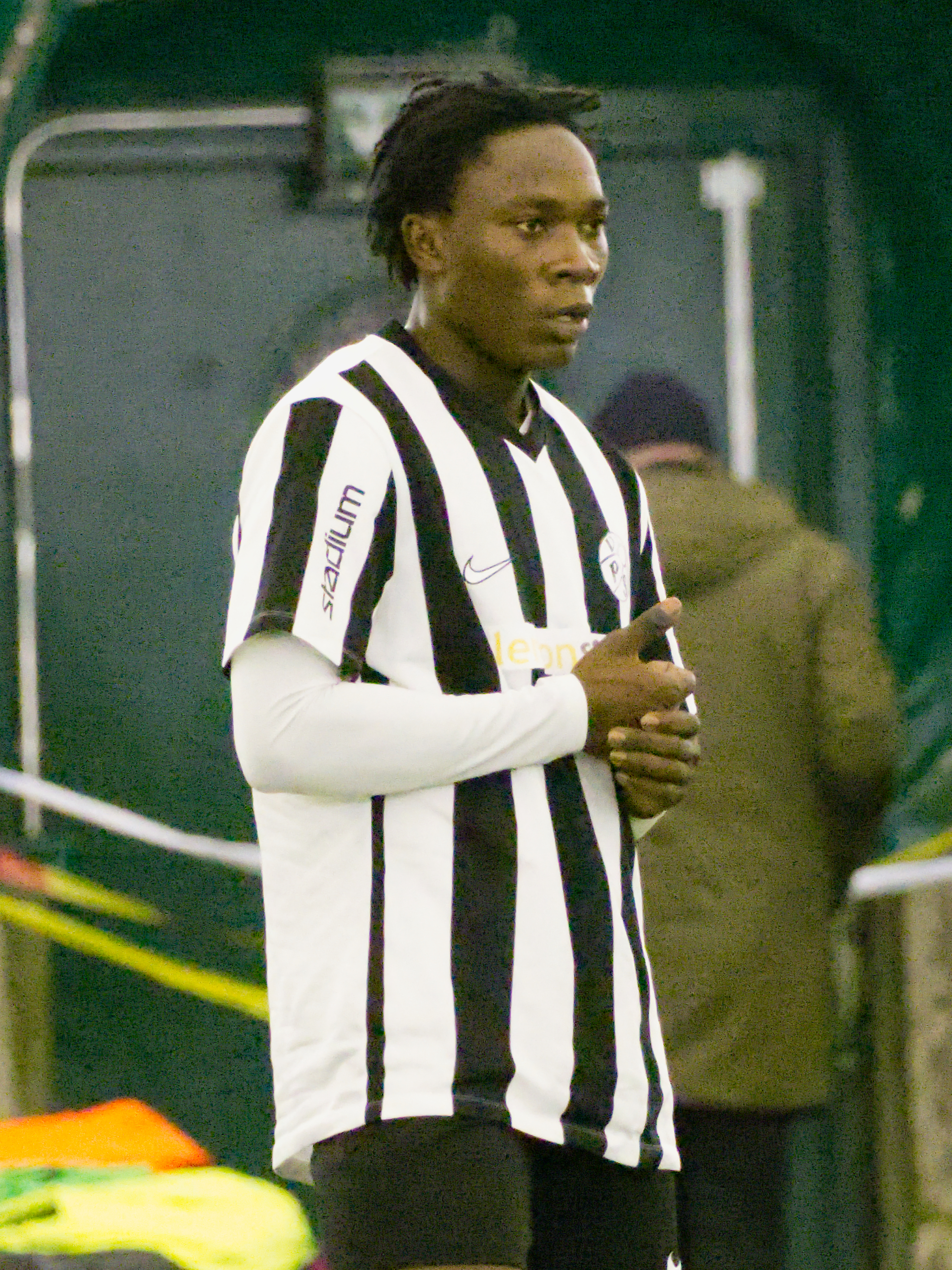
- Mohammed with VPS in 2026

Personal information
- Date of birth: 7 July 2006 (age 20)
- Place of birth: Nigeria
- Position: Forward

Team information
- Current team: VPS
- Number: 13

Youth career
- Mailantarki Care FC

Senior career*
| Years | Team | Apps | (Gls) |
| 2024–2025 | Hammarby TFF | 20 | (2) |
| 2025– | VPS | 3 | (0) |
- * Club domestic league appearances and goals as of 20 November 2025

Tijjani Mohammed (born 7 July 2006) is a Nigerian professional football player who plays as a forward for Veikkausliiga club VPS.

== Career ==
In August 2024, Mohammed joined Swedish Hammarby organisation, initially on loan. He was registered to their reserve team.

On 14 August 2025, he officially signed with Finnish Veikkausliiga club Vaasan Palloseura.
