= 1986 Division 2 (Swedish football) =

Swedish League Division 2
- Season: 1986
- Champions: GIF Sundsvall; Västra Frölunda IF
- Promoted: GIF Sundsvall; Västra Frölunda IF
- Relegated: Enköpings SK; Sandvikens IF; Ope IF; Helsingborgs IF; Markaryd IF; Norrby IF

Statistics of Swedish football Division 2 in season 1986.

== League standings ==
=== Division 2 Norra 1986 ===
Pos	Team	Pld	W	D	L	GF	GA	GD	Pts
1	GIF Sundsvall	26	12	10	4	51	25	+26	34
2	IF Brommapojkarna	26	13	7	6	48	38	+10	33
3	Västerås SK	26	12	8	6	37	28	+9	32
4	Gefle IF	26	12	6	8	41	23	+18	30
5	IFK Västerås	26	10	9	7	39	40	−1	29
6	Vasalunds IF	26	12	4	10	34	29	+5	28
7	Skellefteå AIK	26	11	6	9	31	28	+3	28
8	Degerfors IF	26	8	8	10	35	38	−3	24
9	IFK Eskilstuna	26	9	6	11	41	46	−5	24
10	Luleå FF/IFK	26	7	9	10	25	28	−3	23
11	Örebro SK	26	7	7	12	26	28	−2	21
12	Enköpings SK	26	8	5	13	28	39	−11	21
13	Sandvikens IF	26	7	7	12	31	43	−12	21
14	Ope IF	26	4	8	14	21	55	−34	16

=== Division 2 Södra 1986 ===
Pos	Team	Pld	W	D	L	GF	GA	GD	Pts
1	Västra Frölunda IF	26	18	6	2	48	11	+37	42
2	Mjällby AIF	26	16	7	3	72	24	+48	39
3	GAIS	26	15	8	3	42	15	+27	38
4	Åtvidabergs FF	26	8	13	5	29	31	−2	29
5	Kalmar AIK	26	11	4	11	46	42	+4	26
6	Landskrona BoIS	26	8	9	9	32	34	−2	25
7	Trelleborgs FF	26	9	7	10	32	35	−3	25
8	Karlskrona AIF	26	10	5	11	27	36	−9	25
9	Karlstad BK	26	8	9	9	31	41	−10	25
10	Myresjö IF	26	7	9	10	35	50	−15	23
11	BK Häcken	26	7	8	11	29	37	−8	22
12	Helsingborgs IF	26	7	5	14	23	31	−8	19
13	Markaryds IF	26	3	9	14	29	50	−21	15
14	Norrby IF	26	5	1	20	27	65	−38	11
