= Sweden women's national under-17 football team =

Women's national under-17 association football team representing Sweden

Sweden Women's U-17
- Association: Swedish Football Association
- Confederation: UEFA (Europe)
- Head coach: Anders Bengtsson (players born in 2005); Lotta Hellenberg (players born in 2006); Lovisa Delby (players born in 2007)
- FIFA code: SWE
First colours	Second colours

First international
- Sweden 12–0 Moldova (19 October 2007)

Biggest win
- Sweden 16–0 Armenia (15 October 2008)

Biggest defeat
- Norway 6–0 Sweden (8 March 2016); Poland 6–0 Sweden (20 May 2023)

UEFA Women's Under-17 Championship
- Appearances: 3 (first in 2013)
- Best result: Runners-up (2013)

Sweden women's national under-17 football team is the football team representing Sweden in competitions for under-17 year old players and is controlled by the Swedish Football Association. The team has never qualified for the FIFA U-17 World Cup.

== Competitive record ==
=== FIFA U-17 Women's World Cup ===
The team has never qualified

Year	Result	Matches	Wins	Draws*	Losses	GF	GA
(New Zealand) 2008	Did not qualify						
(Trinidad and Tobago) 2010	Did not qualify						
(Azerbaijan) 2012	Did not qualify						
(Costa Rica) 2014	Did not qualify						
(Jordan) 2016	Did not qualify						
(Uruguay) 2018	Did not qualify						
(India) 2022	Did not qualify						
(Dominican Republic) 2024	Did not qualify						
(Morocco) 2025	Did not qualify						
Total	0/9	0	0	0	0	0	0

=== UEFA Women's Under-17 Championship ===
The team has qualified in 2013.

Year	Round	GP	W	D	L	GF	GA
(Switzerland) 2008	Did not qualify						
(Switzerland) 2009	Did not qualify						
(Switzerland) 2010	Did not qualify						
(Switzerland) 2011	Did not qualify						
(Switzerland) 2012	Did not qualify						
(Switzerland) 2013	Runners-up	2	0	1	1	2	3
(England) 2014	Did not qualify						
(Iceland) 2015	Did not qualify						
(Belarus) 2016	Did not qualify						
(Czech Republic) 2017	Did not qualify						
(Lithuania) 2018	Did not qualify						
(Bulgaria) 2019	Did not qualify						
(Sweden) ~~2020~~	Qualified but tournament later cancelled						
(Faroe Islands) ~~2021~~	Cancelled						
(Bosnia and Herzegovina) 2022	Did not qualify						
(Estonia) 2023	Group stage	3	0	0	3	1	12
(Sweden) 2024	Group stage	3	0	0	3	3	10
(Faroe Islands) 2025	Did not qualify						
(Northern Ireland) 2026	Did not qualify						
(Finland) 2027	to be determined						
(Belgium) 2028	to be determined						
(Turkey) 2029	to be determined						
Total	3/16 app.	8	0	1	7	6	25

== Current squad ==
The following 24 players were named to the 2022 season squad.

Head coach: Lovisa Delby

No.	Pos.	Player	Date of birth (age)	Club
	GK	Mathilda Andersson	13 March 2005 (age 21)	(Swedish Football Association) IK Uppsala Fotboll
	GK	Tilda Torstensson	15 February 2005 (age 21)	(Swedish Football Association) Växjö DFF
	DF	Josefin Baudou	15 June 2005 (age 21)	(Swedish Football Association) IK Uppsala Fotboll
	DF	Ida Garmfors	30 March 2005 (age 21)	(Swedish Football Association) Södra Sandby IF
	DF	Alva Hallengren	9 March 2005 (age 21)	(Swedish Football Association) IFK Kalmar
	DF	Tuva Norell	18 November 2005 (age 20)	(Swedish Football Association) IF Brommapojkarna
	DF	Tova Persson	15 March 2005 (age 21)	(Swedish Football Association) FC Rosengård
	DF	Klara Svensson Senelius	8 June 2005 (age 21)	(Swedish Football Association) Jitex Mölndal BK
	DF	Petronella Winblad	23 February 2005 (age 21)	(Swedish Football Association) Malmö FF
	MF	Lovisa Brogren	24 July 2005 (age 21)	(Swedish Football Association) Halmstads BK
	MF	Thelma Gustavsson	5 June 2005 (age 21)	(Swedish Football Association) Sunnanå SK
	MF	Alva Karlsson	18 January 2005 (age 21)	(Swedish Football Association) Eskilstuna United DFF
	MF	Matilda Larsson	22 October 2005 (age 21)	(Swedish Football Association) Jitex Mölndal BK
	MF	Ebba Lilliehöök	15 July 2005 (age 21)	(Swedish Football Association) IFK Lidingö FK
	MF	Astrid Nyquist	14 January 2005 (age 21)	(Swedish Football Association) Gideonsbergs IF
	MF	Erica Persson Welin	2 September 2005 (age 21)	(Swedish Football Association) Södra Sandby IF
	MF	Bea Sprung (captain)	30 January 2005 (age 21)	(Swedish Football Association) FC Rosengård
	MF	Victoria Svanström	21 August 2005 (age 21)	(Swedish Football Association) IFK Göteborg
	MF	Ida Åkerlund	25 January 2005 (age 21)	(Swedish Football Association) Sundsvalls DFF
	FW	Maja Alvin	11 June 2005 (age 21)	(Swedish Football Association) Eskilstuna United DFF
	FW	Matilda Ekblom	10 August 2006 (age 20)	(Swedish Football Association) Gideonsbergs IF
	FW	Tuva Skoog	25 March 2005 (age 21)	(Swedish Football Association) Umeå IK
	FW	Julia Söderberg	19 March 2005 (age 21)	(Swedish Football Association) IFK Värnamo
	FW	Line Wessman	29 April 2005 (age 21)	(Swedish Football Association) IF Brommapojkarna

=== Head coaches history ===
- Marie Bengtsson (2001–2010)
- Yvonne Ekroth (2010–2015)
- Katarina Olsson (2011–2017)
- Ulf Kristiansson (2016–2017)
- Pia Sundhage (2018–2019)
- Pär Lagerström (2018–2020)
- Lotta Hellenberg (2019–present)
- Lovisa Delby (2021–present)
- Anders Bengtsson (2022–present)

== See also ==
- Sweden women's national football team
- Sweden women's national under-19 football team
- Sweden women's national under-23 football team
- FIFA U-17 Women's World Cup
- UEFA Women's Under-17 Championship
