= Adam Akimey =

Swedish footballer (born 2004)

Personal information
- Date of birth: 21 February 2004 (age 22)
- Place of birth: Bagarmossen, Sweden
- Height: 1.85 m (6 ft 1 in)
- Positions: Winger; forward

Team information
- Current team: Helsingborgs IF
- Number: 9

Youth career
- –2018: IFK Haninge
- 2019–2021: IF Brommapojkarna
- 2022–2023: Hammarby Fotboll

Senior career*
Years	Team	Apps	(Gls)
2024–2025	Hammarby Fotboll	0	(0)
2024	Hammarby Talang FF	28	(11)
2025–	Helsingborgs IF	28	(4)
- * Club domestic league appearances and goals as of 8 November 2025

Adam Akimey (born 21 February 2004) is a Swedish footballer who plays as a winger or forward for Helsingborgs IF.

== Early life ==
Akimey was born on 21 February 2004. Born in Bagarmossen, Sweden, he is a native of Stockholm, Sweden.

== Club career ==
As a youth player, Akimey joined the youth academy of Swedish side IFK Haninge. Following his stint there, he joined the youth academy of Swedish side IF Brommapojkarna in 2019.

Ahead of the 2022 season, he joined the youth academy of Swedish side Hammarby Fotboll and was promoted to the club's reserve team in 2024, where he made twenty-eight league appearances and scored eleven goals. During March 2025, he signed for Swedish side Helsingborgs IF. Beninese news website Le Miroir Magazine wrote in 2025 that he "gradually established himself in the Swedish club's squad" while playing for them.
