= Fredrik Samuelsson =

Fredrik Samuelsson may refer to:

- Fredrik Samuelsson (decathlete) (born 1995), Swedish track and field athlete
- Fredrik Samuelsson (footballer) (born 1980), Swedish footballer and manager
