= Filip Ambrož =

Swedish footballer

Personal information
- Full name: Filip Alexander Ambrož
- Date of birth: 1 December 2003 (age 22)
- Place of birth: Gothenburg, Sweden
- Height: 1.84 m (6 ft 0 in)
- Position: Midfielder

Team information
- Current team: Ljungskile SK
- Number: 10

Youth career
- –2014: Tuve IF
- 2015–2021: IFK Göteborg

Senior career*
Years	Team	Apps	(Gls)
2021–2023	IFK Göteborg	7	(0)
2022	→ Dugopolje (loan)	5	(0)
2023	→ Ljungskile SK (loan)	12	(2)
2024–	Ljungskile SK	76	(4)

International career^{‡}
2019	Croatia U16	3	(0)
- * Club domestic league appearances and goals as of 12 November 2026 ‡ National team caps and goals as of 16:24, 2 April 2023 (UTC)

Filip Alexander Ambrož (born 1 December 2003) is a Croatian footballer who plays for Ljungskile SK as a midfielder.
