= Alexander Johansson (footballer, born 2000) =

Swedish footballer (born 2000)

Personal information
- Full name: Jonas Alexander Johansson
- Date of birth: 27 January 2000 (age 26)
- Height: 1.83 m (6 ft 0 in)
- Position: Forward

Team information
- Current team: Helsingborg
- Number: 16

Youth career
- Harplinge IK
- –2015: Halmstads BK
- 2015–2016: Malmö FF
- 2017–2018: Halmstads BK

Senior career*
| Years | Team | Apps | (Gls) |
| 2018–2023 | Halmstads BK | 46 | (16) |
| 2023–2025 | IF Brommapojkarna | 19 | (2) |
| 2024 | → Varbergs BoIS (loan) | 10 | (5) |
| 2025 | → Utsiktens BK (loan) | 13 | (5) |
| 2025– | Helsingborg | 43 | (17) |
- * Club domestic league appearances and goals as of 12 November 2026

Alexander Johansson (born 27 January 2000) is a Swedish professional footballer who plays as a striker for Helsingborg.

== Career ==
After starting his youth career in Harplinge IK, Johansson moved on to the academy of Halmstads BK, but also trained several times a week with Malmö FF's academy since the age of 12. In July 2015, he moved on to Malmö FF outright. During his time at Malmö, he lived away from home at a young age and did not adapt to an elite sports lifestyle. He returned to Halmstads BK. After being top goalscorer of the U19 Allsvenskan Södra in spring 2018, he was drafted into their senior squad in July 2018.

On 13 July 2025, Johansson signed with Helsingborgs IF on a three-year contract.
