= Shakur Omar =

Swedish footballer (born 2004)

Personal information
- Full name: Abdishakur Bashir Omar
- Date of birth: 31 March 2004 (age 22)
- Place of birth: Halmstad, Sweden
- Height: 1.86 m (6 ft 1 in)
- Position: Forward

Team information
- Current team: Ljungskile
- Number: 11

Youth career
- –2019: IFK Uddevalla
- 2019–2023: Atalanta
- 2023–2025: Genoa

Senior career*
Years	Team	Apps	(Gls)
2025	Rapperswil-Jona	3	(0)
2025–	Ljungskile	31	(7)

International career^{‡}
2021–2022	Sweden U18	5	(2)
2022	Sweden U19	2	(0)
- * Club domestic league appearances and goals as of 12 November 2026 ‡ National team caps and goals as of 26 August 2024

Abdishakur Bashir Omar (born 31 March 2004) is a Swedish footballer who plays as a forward for Ljungskile.

== Life and career ==
Omar was born on 31 March 2004 in Halmstad, Sweden. He is a native of Uddevalla, Sweden. He is of Somali descent. He has regarded Brazil international Neymar as his football idol.

As a youth player, Omar joined the youth academy of Swedish side IFK Uddevalla. In 2019, he joined the youth academy of Italian Serie A side Atalanta. He joined the club at the age of fourteen. He played in the UEFA Youth League while playing for them. In 2023, he joined the youth academy of Italian Serie A side Genoa.

Omar is a Sweden youth international. He has played for the Sweden national under-18 football team and the Sweden national under-19 football team. He made five appearances and scored two goal while playing for the Sweden national under-18 football team. He made two appearances and scored zero goals for the Sweden national under-19 football team.

== Style of play ==
Omar mainly operates as a forward. He can also operate as a left-winger or as a right-winger. He is right-footed. He is known for his strength. He has been described as "not in fact the classic first striker "tower" who waits for the ball in the center of the penalty area, but he loves to participate in the offensive construction maneuver before looking for the goal".
