= Mohamed Bawa =

Libyan footballer (born 2003)

Personal information
- Full name: Mohamed Fathi Bawa
- Date of birth: 20 July 2004 (age 22)
- Place of birth: Gothenburg, Sweden
- Height: 1.77 m (5 ft 10 in)
- Position: Midfielder

Team information
- Current team: GAIS
- Number: 27

Youth career
- 2019: Solväders FC
- 2020: GAIS
- 2021: Häcken
- 2022–2023: GAIS

Senior career*
Years	Team	Apps	(Gls)
2023–	GAIS	6	(0)
2024	→ Norrby (loan)	14	(1)
2025	→ Östersunds (loan)	2	(0)
2025	→ Trollhättan (loan)	12	(2)

International career^{‡}
2026–	Libya	1	(0)
- * Club domestic league appearances and goals as of 8 July 2026 ‡ National team caps and goals as of 13:52, 15 April 2026 (UTC)

Mohamed Fathi Bawa (Arabic: محمد فتحي باوا; born 20 July 2004) is a professional footballer who plays as a midfielder for Allsvenskan club GAIS. Born in Sweden, he plays for the Libya national team.

== Club career ==
Bawa is a product of the youth academies of the Swedish clubs Solväders FC, GAIS, and Häcken, before returning to GAIS in 2022 to finish his development. On 22 January 2024, he was formally promoted to GAIS' senior team and signed a 3-year contract. On 28 July 2024, he joined Norrby IF on loan in the Ettan. The following season on 9 May 2025, he joined Östersunds on loan in the Superettan. After limited playing time, he was recalled and loaned out to Trollhättan in the Ettan. Returning to GAIS, he debuted with the club in the Allsvenskan in a 3–1 loss to Malmö FF on 12 April 2026.

== International career ==
Born in Sweden, Bawa is of Libyan descent and holds dual Swedish and Libyan citizenship. He was called up to the Libya national team for a set of friendlies in March 2026.
