= Max Watson =

Swedish footballer

Personal information
- Date of birth: 3 February 1996 (age 30)
- Height: 1.86 m (6 ft 1 in)
- Position: Centre-back

Team information
- Current team: Örebro SK
- Number: 20

Youth career
- Bankeryds SK
- 2010–2013: Jönköpings Södra IF

Senior career*
Years	Team	Apps	(Gls)
2013–2019	Jönköpings Södra IF	25	(0)
2016–2017	→ Norrby IF (loan)	49	(1)
2019	→ Mjällby AIF (loan)	29	(0)
2020–2021	Mjällby AIF	50	(2)
2022–2024	Maribor	52	(3)
2024–2026	IFK Norrköping	58	(2)
2026	Ruch Chorzów	5	(0)
2026–	Örebro SK	5	(0)

International career
2013	Sweden U19	3	(0)
- * Club domestic league appearances and goals as of 12 November 2026

Max Watson (born 3 February 1996) is a Swedish professional footballer who plays as a centre-back for Superettan club Örebro SK.

== Club career ==
On 11 January 2022, Watson signed a contract with Slovenian PrvaLiga side Maribor until 2024, on a free transfer.

On 14 February 2026, Watson terminated his deal with IFK Norrköping and joined Polish second tier side Ruch Chorzów on a deal until June 2026. He made five appearances for Ruch. Watson left the club at the end of the 2025–26 season after deciding not to extend his contract.

On 26 August 2026, Watson returned to Sweden to join Superettan club Örebro SK.

== International career ==
In 2013, Watson made three appearances for the Swedish under-19 team.

== Personal life ==
Watson played handball in his youth, but later opted for football. He is of English descent, as his father moved from England to Sweden at the age of 18.

== Honours ==
Maribor

- Slovenian PrvaLiga: 2021–22
