= Wenderson (footballer, born 1999) =

Brazilian footballer

Personal information
- Full name: Wenderson Oliveira do Nascimento
- Date of birth: 24 April 1999 (age 27)
- Place of birth: Ceará-Mirim, Rio Grande do Norte, Brazil
- Height: 1.74 m (5 ft 9 in)
- Position: Midfielder

Team information
- Current team: Avaí (on loan from Elfsborg)
- Number: 95

Youth career
- –2016: ABC
- 2016: → Atlético Mineiro (loan)
- 2017–2018: Atlético Mineiro

Senior career*
Years	Team	Apps	(Gls)
2019–2021	ABC	25	(0)
2021–2025	Värnamo	120	(4)
2025–	Elfsborg	14	(0)
2026–	→ Avaí (loan)	27	(1)
- * Club domestic league appearances and goals as of 18 November 2026

Wenderson Oliveira do Nascimento (born 24 April 1999), commonly known as Wenderson, is a Brazilian professional footballer who plays as a midfielder for Avaí, on loan from Elfsborg.

== Career statistics ==
=== Club ===
As of 18 November 2026.

Club	Season	League			State League		Cup		Other		Total	
Club	Season	Division	Apps	Goals	Apps	Goals	Apps	Goals	Apps	Goals	Apps	Goals
ABC	2019	Série C	6	0	4 (Note: Appearances in the Campeonato Potiguar)	0	0	0	2 (Note: Appearances in the Copa do Nordeste)	0	12	0
ABC	2020	Série D	7	0	8	0	1 (Note: Appearances in the Copa do Brasil)	0	4	0	19	0
ABC	Total		13	0	12	0	1	0	6	0	32	0
Värnamo	2021	Superettan	24	2	–		0	0	0	0	24	2
Värnamo	2022	Allsvenskan	27	1	–		2	0	0	0	0	0
Värnamo	2023	Allsvenskan	29	0	–		0	0	0	0	0	0
Värnamo	2024	Allsvenskan	28	1	–		4	0	2 (Note: Appearance(s) in Allsvenskan-playoff relegation matches)	0	0	0
Värnamo	2025	Allsvenskan	12	0	–		3	0	0	0	0	0
Värnamo	Total		120	4	0	0	9	0	2	0	131	4
Elfsborg	2025	Allsvenskan	14	0	–		0	0	0	0	14	0
Avaí	2026	Série B	27	1	–		1	0	5	0	33	1
Career total			174	5	12	0	11	0	13	0	210	5
