= Erik Lindell =

Swedish footballer (born 1996)

Personal information
- Full name: Erik Kristian Lindell
- Date of birth: 14 February 1996 (age 30)
- Place of birth: Norrköping, Sweden
- Height: 1.81 m (5 ft 11 in)
- Position: Right midfielder

Team information
- Current team: Helsingborgs IF
- Number: 31

Youth career
- IFK Norrköping

Senior career*
Years	Team	Apps	(Gls)
2015–2018	IFK Norrköping	0	(0)
2015–2016	→ IF Sylvia (loan)	34	(5)
2017–2018	→ Degerfors IF (loan)	51	(2)
2019–2023	Degerfors IF	103	(1)
2023–2024	AB	30	(0)
2024–2026	Degerfors IF	35	(5)
2026–	Helsingborgs IF	9	(0)
- * Club domestic league appearances and goals as of 12 November 2026

Erik Lindell (born 14 February 1996) is a Swedish professional footballer who plays as a right midfielder for Helsingborgs IF.
