= IFK Vaxholm =

Swedish football club

- Full name: Idrottsföreningen Kamraterna Vaxholm
- Short name: IFK
- Founded: 18 April 1920
- Ground: Vaxö IP; Vaxholm; Sweden
- Capacity: 1000
- Chairman: Jesper Broqvist
- Manager: Micke Berglund
- League: Division 5 Stockholm Norra
- 2018: 11th
- Website: http://www.svenskalag.se/ifkvaxholm
| Home colours | Away colours | Third colours |

IFK Vaxholm is a Swedish football club located in Vaxholm. They were founded 18 April 1920 by Captain Öhngren and they are a part of Idrottsföreningen Kamraterna (IFK). As a part of IFK they wear the blue and white home colours. Ever since the 1940s IFK Vaxholm have played their home games at SEB-Vallen, or as the locals call it, Vaxö IP.

== Background ==
IFK Vaxholm currently plays in Division 4 Stockholm Norra which is the sixth tier of Swedish football. They play their home matches at the SEB-Vallen in Vaxholm . The ladies team currently plays in division 5 Stockholm A. The club has, except 2 senior teams, 18 different age groups between the ages of 5–15, they also have 2 employees working with the club and the youth section.

The club is affiliated to Stockholms Fotbollförbund.

IFK Vaxholm finished 8th place in the 6th tier 2017.

== History ==
The 18 April 1920, a crowd of 50 people gathered to form a sports club in Vaxholm. At first they were i part of IFK Stockholm but in August 1921 they became an independent part of IFK. In 1984 they changed their namn to "Vaxholm/KA 1 IF" after a tie-up with "Vaxholms Kustartilleriregementes IF" but 1989 they changed back. They have had several different kinds of sports during the years:Skiing, bandy, table-tennis, ice hockey and footbaII along with a couple of other sports. Now they only play football. IFK Vaxholm has almost 800 members and they are the biggest sports club in Vaxholm.

In 1974 the first, and only so far, IFK Vaxholm team made it to the "S:t Erikscupen" final. The girls lost VS Rågsveds IF with 5–0.

IFK Vaxholms home ground, Vaxö IP, was founded in 1943 and since 1988 the ground have had artificial grass.

According to Vaxholms website Jesper Winzerling is the best goalscorer in IFK Vaxholm history, 78 goals in 79 games. This statistics haven't been updated since 2007.

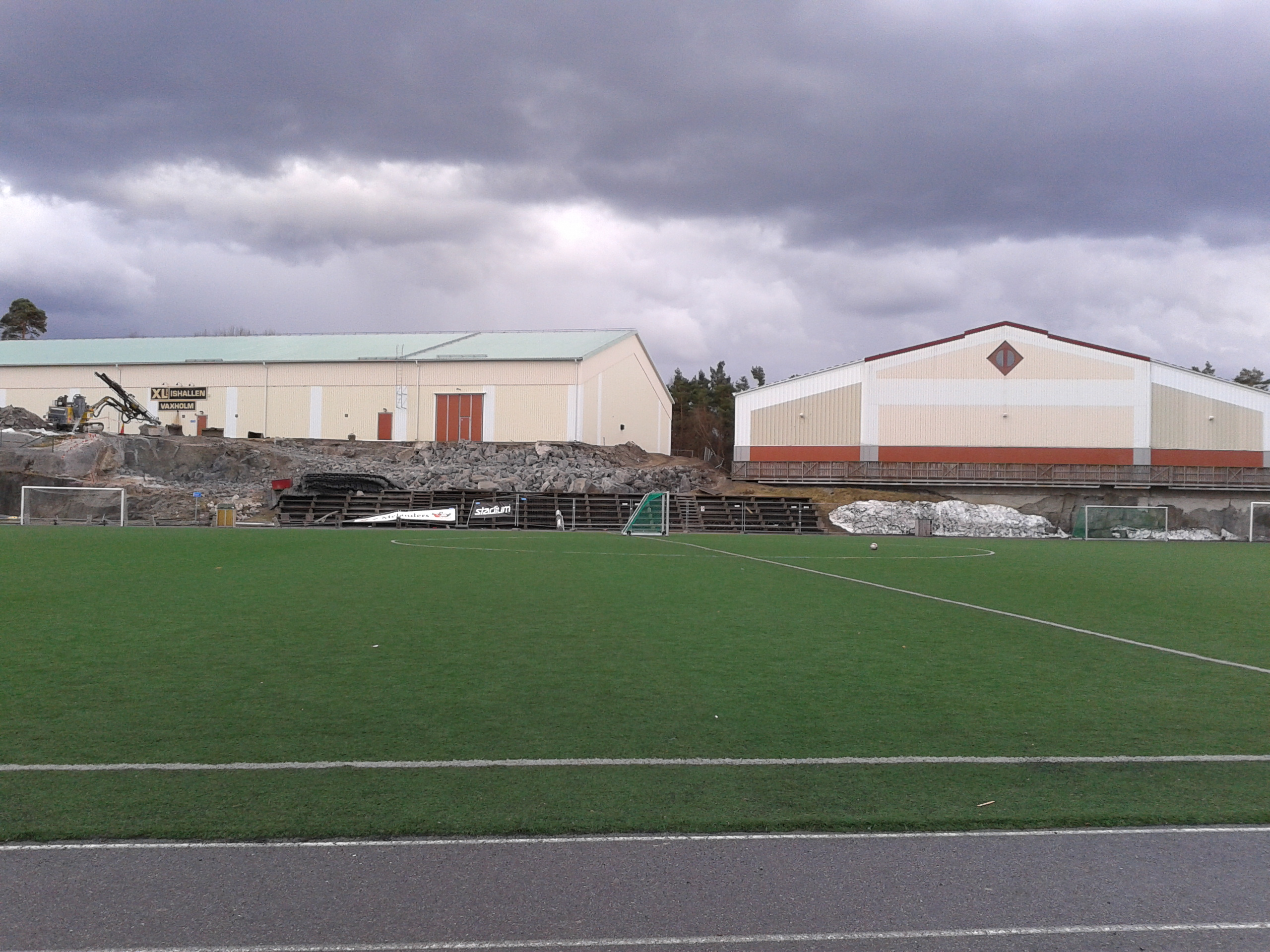
Vaxö IP 2013

== Season to season ==
This only apply to the men's 1st team.

| Season | Level | Division | Section | Position | Movements |
|---|---|---|---|---|---|
| 1999 | Tier 7 | Division 6 | Stockholm A | 2nd | - |
| 2000 | Tier 7 | Division 6 | Stockholm A | 4th | 2 – |
| 2001 | Tier 7 | Division 6 | Stockholm A | 4th | - |
| 2002 | Tier 7 | Division 6 | Stockholm A | 3rd | 1 + |
| 2003 | Tier 7 | Division 6 | Stockholm A | 1st | Promoted |
| 2004 | Tier 6 | Division 5 | Stockholm Norra | 4th | - |
| 2005 | Tier 6 | Division 5 | Stockholm Norra | 2nd | Promoted |
| 2006* | Tier 6 | Division 4 | Stockholm Norra | 10th | - |
| 2007 | Tier 6 | Division 4 | Stockholm Norra | 5th | 5 + |
| 2008 | Tier 6 | Division 4 | Stockholm Norra | 3rd | 2 + |
| 2009 | Tier 6 | Division 4 | Stockholm Norra | 4th | 1 – |
| 2010 | Tier 6 | Division 4 | Stockholm Norra | 3rd | 1 + |
| 2011 | Tier 6 | Division 4 | Stockholm Norra | 10th | 7 – |
| 2012 | Tier 6 | Division 4 | Stockholm Norra | 7th | 3 + |
| 2013 | Tier 6 | Division 4 | Stockholm Norra | 4th | 4 + |
| 2014 | Tier 6 | Division 4 | Stockholm Norra | 5th | 1 – |
| 2015 | Tier 6 | Division 4 | Stockholm Norra | 10th | 5 – |
| 2016 | Tier 6 | Division 4 | Stockholm Norra | 8th | 2 + |
| 2017 | Tier 6 | Division 4 | Stockholm Norra | 8th | - |

* League restructuring in 2006 resulted in a new division being created at Tier 3 and subsequent divisions dropping a level.

== Attendances ==
In recent seasons IFK Vaxholm have had the following average attendances:

| Season | Average attendance | Division / Section | Level |
|---|---|---|---|
| 2005 | 77 | Division 5 Stockholm Norra | Tier 6 |
| 2006 | 128 | Division 4 Stockholm Norra | Tier 6 |
| 2007 | 126 | Division 4 Stockholm Norra | Tier 6 |
| 2008 | 129 | Division 4 Stockholm Norra | Tier 6 |
| 2009 | 140 | Division 4 Stockholm Norra | Tier 6 |
| 2010 | 75 | Division 4 Stockholm Norra | Tier 6 |
| 2011 | 85 | Division 4 Stockholm Norra | Tier 6 |
| 2012 | 59 | Division 4 Stockholm Norra | Tier 6 |
| 2013 | 44 | Division 4 Stockholm Norra | Tier 6 |
| 2014 | 61 | Division 4 Stockholm Norra | Tier 6 |
| 2015 | 80 | Division 4 Stockholm Norra | Tier 6 |
| 2016 | 93 | Division 4 Stockholm Norra | Tier 6 |
| 2017 | 105 | Division 4 Stockholm Norra | Tier 6 |

* Attendances are provided in the Publikliga sections of the Svenska Fotbollförbundet website and from Vaxholms webpage.

== The 200-games Club ==
This is a list of players who have played more than 200 games for the club:

- (Sweden) Lars Wohlfart 266
- (Sweden) Lennart Rundlöf 237
- (Sweden) Leopold Granquist 230
- (Sweden) Ulf Hägglund 220
- (Sweden) Christer Thorell 217
- (Sweden) Bengt Sandell 212
- (Sweden) Rickard Tepponen 209
- (Sweden) Rolf Olofsson 200
- (Sweden) Bo Eriksson 200
- (Sweden) Nicklas Ewertzh 200+

The IFK Centralorganisation has given out an award for playing for more than 20 years for a club to:

- Tore Hedström – Born in 1916 and received the award in 1960.
- Otto Malmlund – Born in 1909 and received the award in 1960.
- Harry Svensson – Awarded in 1960.
