= Liiban Abadid =

Norwegian footballer (born 2002)

Personal information
- Full name: Liiban Abdirahman Abadid
- Date of birth: 1 July 2002 (age 24)
- Place of birth: Norway
- Height: 1.85 m (6 ft 1 in)
- Position: Centre-back

Team information
- Current team: Nordic United
- Number: 4

Youth career
- Bjorndal IF
- Oppsal IF
- KFUM
- –2021: Grorud IL

Senior career*
Years	Team	Apps	(Gls)
2019	KFUM 2	17	(0)
2021	Grorud IL 2	7	(0)
2022	Assyriska BK	12	(1)
2023	Trollhättan	14	(0)
2023	Brommapojkarna	0	(0)
2024	→ AC Oulu (loan)	25	(0)
2025–2026	Västerås SK	9	(0)
2025	→ Utsikten (loan)	8	(0)
2026-	→ Nordic United (loan)	6	(0)
- * Club domestic league appearances and goals as of 12 November 2026

Liiban Abdirahman Abadid (born 1 July 2002) is a Norwegian professional footballer who plays as a centre-back for Nordic United.

== Club career ==
Abadid joined IF Brommapojkarna in July 2023.

After spending the 2024 season on loan with Veikkausliiga club AC Oulu, Abadid joined Västerås SK in Sweden on a four-year deal, starting in January 2025.

On 4 August 2025, Abadid was loaned out to Utsiktens BK for the rest of the season.

== Personal life ==
Born in Norway, Abadid is of Somali descent.

== Career statistics ==
As of 5 May 2025

Appearances and goals by club, season and competition
Club	Season	League			National cup (Note: Includes Svenska Cupen and Suomen Cup)		Europe		Other		Total	
Club	Season	Division	Apps	Goals	Apps	Goals	Apps	Goals	Apps	Goals	Apps	Goals
KFUM 2	2019	4. divisjon	17	0	–		–		–		17	0
Grorud IL 2	2021	3. divisjon	7	0	–		–		–		7	0
Assyriska BK	2022	Swedish Division 2	12	1	–		–		–		12	1
Trollhättan	2023	Ettan	14	0	4	0	–		–		18	0
IF Brommapojkarna	2023	Allsvenskan	0	0	2	0	–		–		2	0
AC Oulu (loan)	2024	Veikkausliiga	25	0	4	0	–		0	0	29	0
Västerås SK	2025	Superettan	9	0	3	0	–		–		12	0
Utsiktens BK (loan)	2025	Superettan	0	0	0	0	–		–		0	0
Career total			84	1	13	0	0	0	0	0	97	1
