= Saah Moses Jr. =

Liberian footballer (born 2007)

Personal information
- Date of birth: 10 July 2007 (age 19)
- Place of birth: Monrovia, Liberia
- Height: 1.75 m (5 ft 9 in)
- Position: Midfielder

Team information
- Current team: Hammarby TFF

Senior career*
Years	Team	Apps	(Gls)
2023–2025	Discoveries SA		
2025–	Hammarby IF	0	(0)
2025–	→ Hammarby TFF	36	(2)

International career^{‡}
2022	Liberia U17		
2023–	Liberia	2	(0)
- * Club domestic league appearances and goals as of 10 November 2026 ‡ National team caps and goals as of 20 November 2023

Saah Moses Jr. (born 10 July 2007) is a Liberian professional footballer who plays as a midfielder for Swedish club Hammarby TFF and the Liberia national team.

== Club career ==
Moses was a youth product of his local club Discoveries SA. In December 2023, Swedish media announced that Hammarby had reached an agreement with Discoveries SA and Moses to sign him in 2024, in a deal reported to be valued at $150,000.

== International career ==
In October 2024, Moses received his first call up to the Liberia national team. At 16 years old and 7 days he made his international debut in a 3–2 loss against Libya on 14 October 2023.
