= Elton Hedström =

Swedish footballer (born 2003)

Personal information
- Full name: Jens Daniel Elton Hedström
- Date of birth: 11 June 2003 (age 23)
- Place of birth: Sweden
- Position: Centre-forward

Team information
- Current team: Ljungskile (on loan from Brommapojkarna)
- Number: 18

Youth career
- Umeå

Senior career*
Years	Team	Apps	(Gls)
2021–2022	Umeå Akademi	33	(12)
2023	Skellefteå FF	24	(22)
2024–2025	Hammarby TFF	25	(11)
2024	→ EIF (loan)	8	(0)
2025–	Brommapojkarna	7	(0)
2025	→ Hammarby TFF (loan)	4	(2)
2026–	→ Ljungskile (loan)	12	(2)
- * Club domestic league appearances and goals as of 12 November 2026

Jens Daniel Elton Hedström (born 11 June 2003) is a Swedish professional footballer who plays as a centre-forward for Ljungskile, on loan from Brommapojkarna.
