= Fredrik Samuelsson (footballer) =

Swedish footballer and manager

Personal information
- Full name: Fredrik Sigvard Samuelsson
- Date of birth: 14 October 1980 (age 46)
- Place of birth: Sweden
- Height: 1.80 m (5 ft 11 in)
- Position: Defender

Team information
- Current team: Hammarby IF (Assistant coach)

Youth career
- Assyriska FF

Senior career*
Years	Team	Apps	(Gls)
1997–2002	Assyriska FF	92	(1)
2003–2007	Örebro SK	92	(1)
2008–2012	Assyriska FF	79	(0)

Managerial career
- 2013: Assyriska FF (U19)
- 2014–2016: Assyriska FF (assistant)
- 2015: Assyriska FF (caretaker)
- 2016: Assyriska FF
- 2017–2019: Hammarby IF (U17)
- 2020–2023: Hammarby IF (U19)
- 2023–2025: Hammarby TFF
- 2026–: Hammarby IF (assistant)
- * Club domestic league appearances and goals

Fredrik Sigvard Samuelsson (born 14 October 1980) is a Swedish football manager and former footballer who played as a defender. He is the assistant coach of Hammarby IF.

== Manager career ==
=== Assyriska FF ===
After retiring in 2013, Samuelsson began his coaching career with the U19 team at Assyriska FF

Samuelsson was appointed as new assistant manager for Assyriska FF in 2014 under manager Azrudin Valentić. Valentić got fired in May 2014, and Samuelsson took over as a caretaker, until the new manager, Sören Åkeby, arrived two days after.

Azrudin Valentić arrived as manager once again in September 2014, but decided to leave the club in October 2015, and Samuelsson was once again appointed as caretaker until the new year. Then Tor-Arne Fredheim was hired as head coach, but got fired May 2016 and this time, Assyriska FF decided to hire Samuelsson as the head coach instead of as caretaker. Samuelsson was fired on 10 October 2016.

=== Hammarby IF ===
Samuelsson was hired as U17 coach at Hammarby IF starting from 1 January 2017.
