= Ljungskile SK =

Swedish football club

- Full name: Ljungskile Sportklubb
- Founded: 16 May 1926; 100 years ago
- Ground: Skarsjövallen, Ljungskile
- Capacity: 5,500
- Chairman: Bo Fagerberg
- Head coach: Joakim Jensen
- League: Superettan
- 2025: Ettan Södra, 1st of 16 (promoted)
Home colours	Away colours

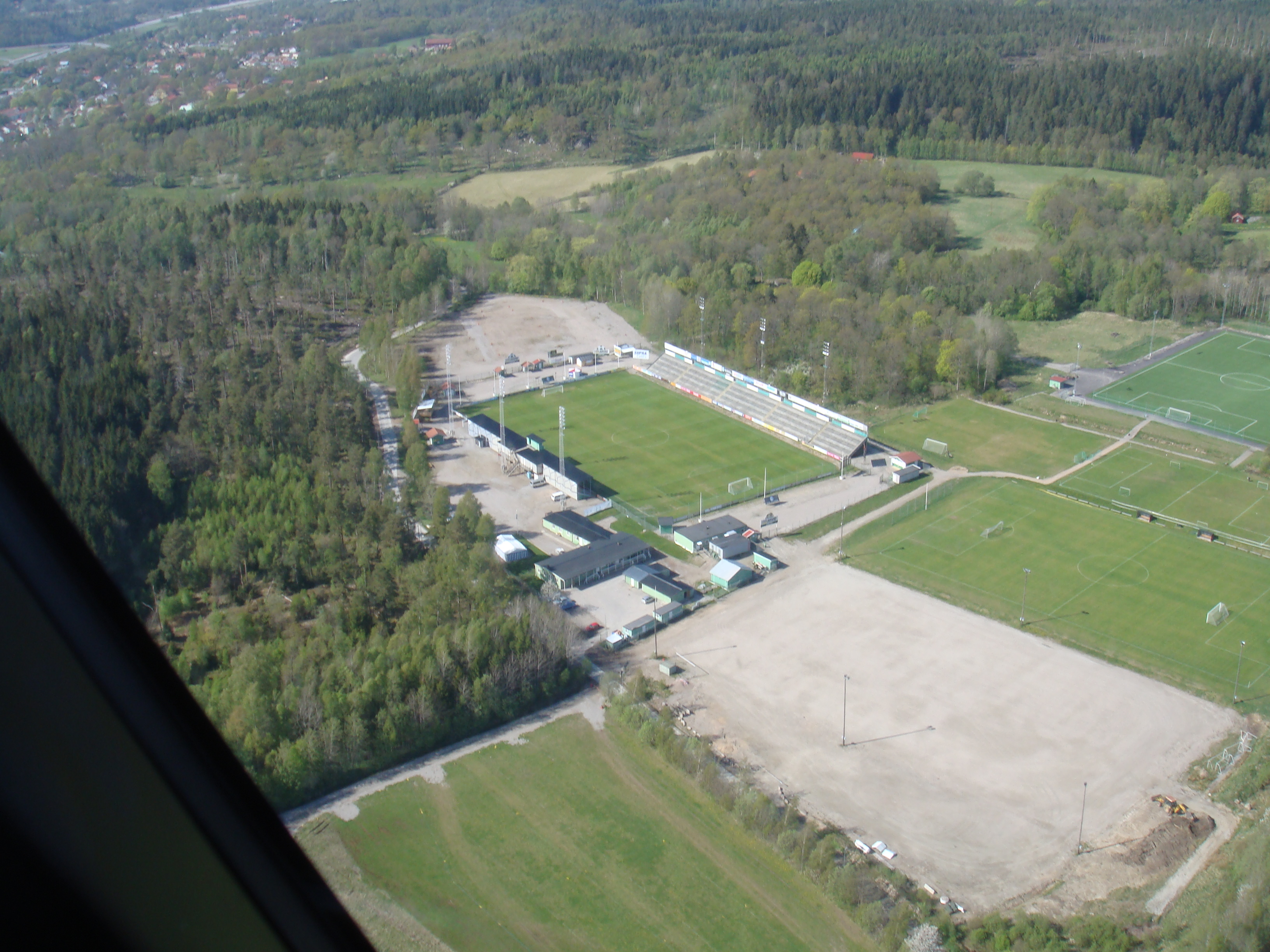
Uddevalla Arena

Ljungskile SK is a Swedish professional football club located in Ljungskile, a town within Uddevalla Municipality. They currently play in Superettan, the second tier of Swedish football, after promotion from Ettan in 2025.

== History ==
Ljungskile SK, formed in 1926, is famous for their promotions between 1990 and 1997. In 1990, Ljungskile SK was playing in Swedish Division 5 and gained promotion to Division 4, Division 3, Division 2, Division 1 until they reached Allsvenskan in 1997.

The club soon gained sponsorship by the swimwear producer Panos Emporio after advancing for the first time to Allsvenskan (LSK defeated Umeå FC when attending the qualifying round in November 1996), and played under the name Panos Ljungskile SK from 1997 to 2002. The club was relegated two times (1997 and 2000) during these years, and played some years in Division 2 Västra Götaland before they managed to gain promotion back to Superettan in late 2004, defeating Väsby IK in the qualifying round. On October 21, 2007, the club gained promotion for the second time ever to Allsvenskan by defeating Landskrona BoIS away. During 2008 the club managed to replace IFK Uddevalla as Bohuslän's most successful club in the history of Allsvenskan.

== Season-to-season ==
Season	Level	League	Pos
Ljungskile SK
1993	Tier 3	Division 2 Västra Götaland	1st (P)
1994	Tier 2	Division 1 Södra	7th
1995	Tier 2	Division 1 Södra	5th
1996	Tier 2	Division 1 Södra	2nd (P)
Panos Ljungskile SK
1997	Tier 1	Allsvenskan	14th (R)
1998	Tier 2	Division 1 Södra	6th
1999	Tier 2	Division 1 Södra	4th
2000	Tier 2	Superettan	15th (R)
2001	Tier 3	Division 2 Västra Götaland	1st
2002	Tier 3	Division 2 Västra Götaland	6th
Ljungskile SK
2003	Tier 3	Division 2 Västra Götaland	2nd
2004	Tier 3	Division 2 Västra Götaland	1st (P)
2005	Tier 2	Superettan	4th
2006 (Note: League restructuring in 2006 resulted in a new division being created at Tier 3 and subsequent divisions dropping a level.)	Tier 2	Superettan	6th
2007	Tier 2	Superettan	2nd (P)
2008	Tier 1	Allsvenskan	14th (R)
2009	Tier 2	Superettan	9th
2010	Tier 2	Superettan	6th
2011	Tier 2	Superettan	8th
2012	Tier 2	Superettan	5th
2013	Tier 2	Superettan	9th
2014	Tier 2	Superettan	3rd
2015	Tier 2	Superettan	6th
2016	Tier 2	Superettan	15th (R)
2017	Tier 3	Division 1 Södra	7th
2018	Tier 3	Division 1 Södra	6th
2019	Tier 3	Division 1 Södra	1st (P)
2020	Tier 2	Superettan	16th (R)
2021	Tier 3	Division 1 Södra	6th
2022	Tier 3	Division 1 Södra	5th
2023	Tier 3	Division 1 Södra	10th
2024	Tier 3	Division 1 Södra	11th
2025	Tier 3	Division 1 Södra	1st (P)
2026	Tier 2	Superettan	12th

== Players ==
=== First-team squad ===
As of 4 September 2026

Note: Flags indicate national team as defined under FIFA eligibility rules; some limited exceptions apply. Players may hold more than one non-FIFA nationality.

No.	Pos.	Nation	Player
1	GK	SWE	Lukas Eriksson
2	DF	SWE	Rasmus Dahlin (on loan from Göteborg U19)
3	DF	SWE	Gustav Johanströmmer Hedin
5	DF	SWE	Filip Örnblom
7	FW	SWE	Jonathan Liljedahl
8	MF	SWE	Vilmer Tyrén (on loan from Kalmar)
9	FW	SWE	Alex Rasheed
10	MF	CRO	Filip Ambrož
11	FW	SWE	Shakur Omar
12	DF	BIH	Ivan Marić
13	FW	SWE	William Nilsson
14	MF	SWE	Daniel Lagerlöf
15	MF	SWE	David Frisk
16	DF	SWE	Emilio Reljanovic

No.	Pos.	Nation	Player
17	MF	SWE	Ludvig Jagdell
18	FW	SWE	Hugo Borstam
19	FW	SWE	Elton Hedström (on loan from Brommapojkarna)
20	GK	NZL	Cameron Hogg
21	FW	SWE	Alfons Borén (on a loan-list from IFK Göteborg)
22	FW	SWE	Ailo Zackrisson
23	DF	SWE	Mehmet Uzul
37	GK	SWE	William Henriksson Liljedahl
45	FW	SWE	Isaac Shears
58	MF	SWE	Samuel Adrian
60	DF	GHA	Gideon Mensah
71	FW	SWE	Daniel Ljung
99	FW	SWE	Lukas Lindholm Corner

=== Out on loan ===
Note: Flags indicate national team as defined under FIFA eligibility rules; some limited exceptions apply. Players may hold more than one non-FIFA nationality.

No. / Pos. / Nation / Player; 17 / DF / SWE / Alexander Björk (at Grebbestads IF until 30 November 2026)	No. / Pos. / Nation / Player; — / DF / SWE / Samuel Högblom (at Grebbestads IF until 30 November 2026)

== Former coaches ==
- (Sweden) Johan Brinck (1995)
- (Sweden) Lars-Olof Mattsson (1996–97, 2006, 2017–18)
- (Sweden) Bo Wålemark (1998)
- (Sweden) Jan Jönsson (1998–2000)
- (Sweden) Lars-Gunnar Hermansson (2001–02)
- (England) David Wilson (2003–05, 2006–08)
- (Iceland) Gudmundur Magnusson (2009)
- (Sweden) Jörgen Wålemark (2009–11, 2018–20)
- (Sweden) Tor-Arne Fredheim (2012–15, 2020–21)
- (Sweden) Jonas Olsson (2015–16)
- (Sweden) Zoran Lukić (2016)
- (Sweden) Glenn Ståhl (2017)
- (Bosnia and Herzegovina) Aleksandar Kitić (2018)
- (Sweden) Erik Lund Fahlén (2021, 2022–24)
- (Serbia) Darko Janacković (2021)

== Achievements ==
=== League ===
- Superettan:
  - Runners-up (1): 2007
- Division 1 Södra:
  - Runners-up (1): 1996
