= Finlay Neat =

Swedish footballer

Personal information
- Full name: Finlay Giuseppe Neat
- Date of birth: 20 February 2006 (age 20)
- Place of birth: Scotland
- Position: Forward

Team information
- Current team: IK Sirius
- Number: 23

Youth career
- –2019: Aberdeen
- 2019–2025: Malmö FF

Senior career*
| Years | Team | Apps | (Gls) |
| 2025– | IK Sirius | 3 | (0) |
| 2026– | → Norrby IF (loan) | 6 | (0) |
- * Club domestic league appearances and goals as of 12 November 2026

Finlay Giuseppe Neat (born 8 February 2006) is a Scottish professional footballer who plays as a forward for Superettan club Norrby IF, on loan from Allsvenskan club IK Sirius.

== Career ==
Neat began his career in the youth system of Aberdeen, but joined the academy of Malmö FF when his family moved to Sweden after his father received a marine biology professorship at the World Maritime University in Malmö. With Malmö FF's under-19s Neat proved a prolific goalscorer in the first half of 2025, with 8 goals in 7 U19 League Cup appearances, and 9 goals scored in 11 P19 Allsvenskan appearances. In a game against Kalmar FF's under-19s he scored a hat-trick within 7 minutes. He ultimately became joint top scorer of P19 Allsvenskan, and was awarded Forward of the Year.

On 24 June 2025, Neat signed for IK Sirius, being reunited with assistant coach Max Westerberg, his former coach with the Malmö FF under-19s. A few weeks later, on 15 July 2025, he made his professional debut as an 81st minute substitute in a 1–2 loss against Mjällby AIF. After making zero league appearances for Sirius the following season, in August 2026 he was sent on a loan to Superettan club Norrby IF for the remainder of the year.

== Personal life ==
Neat was born in Scotland to a Scottish marine biologist father and an Italian mother. When rehabbing an injury, he also worked as a coach for Malmö FF's youth team born 2012.

== Honours ==
Individual

- P19 Allsvenskan Forward of the Year: 2025
