= Norrby IF =

Swedish football club

- Full name: Norrby Idrottsförening
- Founded: 27 April 1927; 99 years ago
- Ground: Borås Arena
- Capacity: 16,200
- Manager: Tobias Linderoth
- League: Ettan
- 2025: Ettan Södra, 2nd of 16
- Website: https://www.norrbyif.se
Home colours	Away colours

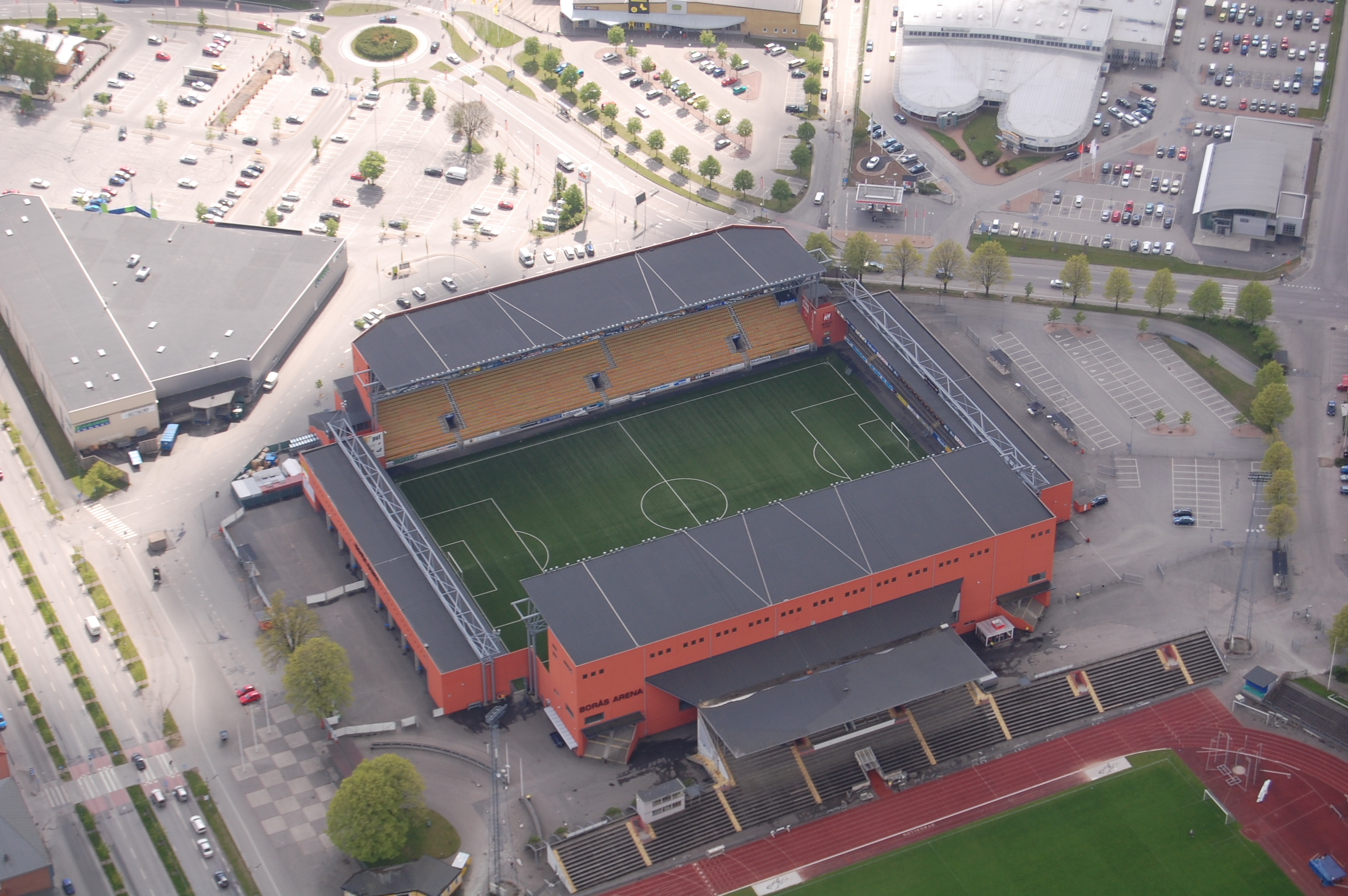
Borås Arena

Norrby IF is a Swedish professional football club based in Borås. Founded on 27 April 1927, the club is currently competing in the Superettan.

== Background ==
The club's best achievement was being promoted to Allsvenskan (top level of Swedish football), after winning the second division in 1955. In Allsvenskan the team only managed to win three games, and were relegated after just one season, and have never returned to top-level football.

Norrby IF's average attendance in the top division, established through the course of the sole 1956 season, is 9,971.

The club is affiliated to the Västergötlands Fotbollförbund.

== Season to season ==
Season	Level	Division	Section	Position	Movements
1940–41	Tier 4	Division 4	?	1st	Promoted
1941–42	Tier 3	Division 3	Västsvenska Norra	8th	
1942–43	Tier 3	Division 3	Västsvenska Norra	8th	
1943–44	Tier 3	Division 3	Västsvenska Norra	6th	
1944–45	Tier 3	Division 3	Västsvenska Norra	2nd	
1945–46	Tier 3	Division 3	Västsvenska Norra	4th	
1946–47	Tier 3	Division 3	Västsvenska Norra	1st	Promotion Playoffs – Not Promoted
1947–48	Tier 3	Division 3	Västra	5th	
1948–49	Tier 3	Division 3	Västra	2nd	
1949–50	Tier 3	Division 3	Västra	1st	Promoted
1950–51	Tier 2	Division 2	Sydvästra	6th	
1951–52	Tier 2	Division 2	Sydvästra	3rd	
1952–53	Tier 2	Division 2	Sydvästra	3rd	
1953–54	Tier 2	Division 2	Götaland	3rd	
1954–55	Tier 2	Division 2	Götaland	1st	Promoted
1955–56	Tier 1	Allsvenskan		11th	Relegated
1956–57	Tier 2	Division 2	Västra Götaland	4th	
1957–58	Tier 2	Division 2	Västra Götaland	3rd	
1959	Tier 2	Division 2	Västra Götaland	9th	
1960	Tier 2	Division 2	Västra Götaland	3rd	
1961	Tier 2	Division 2	Västra Götaland	4th	
1962	Tier 2	Division 2	Västra Götaland	3rd	
1963	Tier 2	Division 2	Västra Götaland	4th	
1964	Tier 2	Division 2	Västra Götaland	10th	Relegated
1965	Tier 3	Division 3	Sydvästra Götaland	4th	
1966	Tier 3	Division 3	Nordvästra Götaland	5th	
1967	Tier 3	Division 3	Sydvästra Götaland	1st	Promoted
1968	Tier 2	Division 2	Norra Götaland	10th	Relegated
1969	Tier 3	Division 3	Nordvästra Götaland	1st	Promoted
1970	Tier 2	Division 2	Norra Götaland	10th	Relegated
1971	Tier 3	Division 3	Sydvästra Götaland	4th	
1972	Tier 3	Division 3	Nordvästra Götaland	3rd	
1973	Tier 3	Division 3	Sydvästra Götaland	1st	Promotion Playoffs – Not Promoted
1974	Tier 3	Division 3	Sydvästra Götaland	4th	
1975	Tier 3	Division 3	Sydvästra Götaland	1st	Promotion Playoffs – Promoted
1976	Tier 2	Division 2	Södra	5th	
1977	Tier 2	Division 2	Södra	7th	
1978	Tier 2	Division 2	Södra	2nd	
1979	Tier 2	Division 2	Södra	12th	Relegated
1980	Tier 3	Division 3	Mellersta Götaland	1st	Promotion Playoffs – Not Promoted
1981	Tier 3	Division 3	Mellersta Götaland	1st	Promotion Playoffs – Not Promoted
1982	Tier 3	Division 3	Mellersta Götaland	2nd	
1983	Tier 3	Division 3	Mellersta Götaland	1st	Promotion Playoffs – Promoted
1984	Tier 2	Division 2	Södra	7th	
1985	Tier 2	Division 2	Södra	5th	
1986	Tier 2	Division 2	Södra	14th	Relegated
1987	Tier 3	Division 3	Västra	6th	
1988	Tier 3	Division 3	Västra	11th	
1989	Tier 3	Division 3	Västra	7th	
1990	Tier 3	Division 3	Västra	6th	
1991	Tier 3	Division 3	Östra Götaland	2nd	Spring – Promotion Playoff – Not Promoted
1991	Tier 3	Division 3	Östra Götaland	5th	Autumn
1992	Tier 3	Division 3	Östra Götaland	2nd	Spring – Promotion Playoff – Not Promoted
1992	Tier 3	Division 3	Östra Götaland	5th	Autumn
1993	Tier 3	Division 2	Västra Götaland	4th	
1994	Tier 3	Division 2	Västra Götaland	2nd	Promotion Playoffs – Promoted
1995	Tier 2	Division 1	Södra	11th	Relegated
1996	Tier 3	Division 2	Västra Götaland	1st	Promoted
1997	Tier 2	Division 1	Södra	10th	
1998	Tier 2	Division 1	Södra	11th	Relegated
1999	Tier 3	Division 2	Västra Götaland	1st	Promotion Playoffs
2000	Tier 3	Division 2	Västra Götaland	6th	
2001	Tier 3	Division 2	Västra Götaland	6th	
2002	Tier 3	Division 2	Östra Götaland	11th	Relegated
2003	Tier 4	Division 3	Mellersta Götaland	1st	Promoted
2004	Tier 3	Division 2	Östra Götaland	2nd	
2005	Tier 3	Division 2	Mellersta Götaland	2nd	Promoted
2006*	Tier 3	Division 1	Södra	3rd	
2007	Tier 3	Division 1	Södra	10th	
2008	Tier 3	Division 1	Södra	13th	Relegated
2009	Tier 4	Division 2	Mellersta Götaland	1st	Promoted
2010	Tier 3	Division 1	Södra	9th	
2011	Tier 3	Division 1	Södra	8th	
2012	Tier 3	Division 1	Södra	13th	Relegated
2013	Tier 4	Division 2	Västra Götaland	1st	Promoted
2014	Tier 3	Division 1	Södra	6th	
2015	Tier 3	Division 1	Södra	10th	
2016	Tier 3	Division 1	Södra	2nd	Promoted
2017	Tier 2	Superettan		10th	
2018	Tier 2	Superettan		12th	
2019	Tier 2	Superettan		9th	
2020	Tier 2	Superettan		11th	
2021	Tier 2	Superettan		4th	
2022	Tier 2	Superettan		15th	Relegated
2023	Tier 3	Ettan	Södra	6th	
2024	Tier 3	Ettan	Södra	8th	
2025	Tier 3	Ettan	Södra	2nd	Promoted

* League restructuring in 2006 resulted in a new division being created at Tier 3 and subsequent divisions dropping a level.

== Players ==
=== Current squad ===
As of 1 September, 2026

Note: Flags indicate national team as defined under FIFA eligibility rules; some limited exceptions apply. Players may hold more than one non-FIFA nationality.

No.	Pos.	Nation	Player
1	GK	SWE	Sebastian Banozic
2	DF	SWE	David Bendrik
3	DF	SWE	Johannes Engvall (on loan from BK Häcken)
4	DF	SWE	Aldin Nedzibovic
5	DF	SWE	Vidar Svendsén
6	MF	SWE	Joel Hjalmar
7	FW	SWE	Julius Johansson
8	MF	SWE	Malte Wester
9	FW	NGR	Yusuf Abdulazeez
10	FW	SWE	Jamie Bachis
11	MF	SWE	Kevin Liimatainen
12	GK	SWE	Tim Svensson Lillvik
13	FW	NGR	Ibrahim Adewale (on loan from Mjällby AIF)
14	MF	SWE	Olle Backlund

No.	Pos.	Nation	Player
15	FW	POR	Elói Ferreira
16	MF	SWE	Filip Gustafsson (on loan from GAIS)
17	DF	SWE	Ture Spendler
18	DF	SWE	Charlie Axede
19	FW	SCO	Finlay Neat (on loan from Sirius)
20	MF	SEN	Ibrahima Dembélé
21	DF	SWE	Wilhelm Ekdal
25	MF	SWE	Malte Ljungkull (on loan from BK Häcken)
26	DF	SWE	Johan Brådenmark
27	MF	SWE	Adam Sjöberg
28	FW	SWE	Hugo Tilly
-	MF	SWE	Leon Isa
-	FW	SWE	Musse Bäck Engström

=== Out on loan ===
Note: Flags indicate national team as defined under FIFA eligibility rules; some limited exceptions apply. Players may hold more than one non-FIFA nationality.

No.	Pos.	Nation	Player
13	FW	SWE	Liam Björninger (at BK Olympic)
20	MF	SWE	Lendi Haziraj (at Dalstorps IF)

No.	Pos.	Nation	Player
23	GK	SWE	Albin Neziri (at Qviding FIF)

== Management ==
=== Technical staff ===
As of 4 April 2018

Name	Role
(Lebanon) Mak Lind	Manager
(Sweden) Korosh Hatami	Head coach
(Sweden) Fredrik Berglund	Assistant coach
(Sweden) Christian Carlsson	Goalkeeping coach

== Attendances ==
In recent seasons Norrby IF have had the following average attendances:

Season	Average attendance	Division / Section	Level
2005	559	Div 2 Mellersta Götaland	Tier 3
2006	336	Div 1 Södra	Tier 3
2007	286	Div 1 Södra	Tier 3
2008	295	Div 1 Södra	Tier 3
2009	381	Div 2 Mellersta Götaland	Tier 4
2010	512	Div 1 Södra	Tier 3
2011	634	Div 1 Södra	Tier 3
2012	480	Div 1 Södra	Tier 3
2013	438	Div 2 Västra Götaland	Tier 4
2014	398	Div 1 Södra	Tier 3
2015	415	Div 1 Södra	Tier 3
2016	722	Div 1 Södra	Tier 3
2017	790	Superettan	Tier 2
2018	657	Superettan	Tier 2
2019	543	Superettan	Tier 2
2020	0	Superettan	Tier 2
2021	427	Superettan	Tier 2

* Attendances are provided in the Publikliga sections of the Svenska Fotbollförbundet website.

== Achievements ==
=== League ===
- Division 1 Södra:
  - Runners-up (1): 2016
