= Hammarby Talang FF =

Association football club in Stockholm, Sweden

- Full name: Hammarby Talangfotbollförening Herrfotboll
- Nickname: HTFF
- Founded: 2003; 23 years ago (as Hammarby Talang Fotbollförening); 2016; 10 years ago (as Hammarby Talang Fotbollförening); 4 March 2021; 5 years ago (as Hammarby Talangfotbollförening Herrfotboll)
- Ground: Hammarby IP, Stockholm, Sweden
- Capacity: 3,700
- Chairman: Stephan Thernström
- Head coach: Fredrik Samuelsson
- League: Ettan
- 2025: 2nd of 16
- Website: www.htff.se
Home colours

Hammarby Talang FF, more commonly known as Hammarby TFF or HTFF for short, is a Swedish football club from Stockholm. Originally founded in 2003, the club was dissolved in 2011 before being re-incorporated in 2016 and again in 2021.

Competing in Ettan, the domestic third tier, it is the feeder team of Hammarby IF in Allsvenskan and is focused on providing experience and training for young players.

The club holds home matches at the stadium Hammarby IP in the district of Södermalm, accommodating 3,700 spectators.

Its colours are black and yellow, as an homage to its latest predecessor, IK Frej. The same colours are worn by HTFF's parent club, Hammarby IF, as an alternative jersey.

Hammarby Talang FF is affiliated with the Stockholms Fotbollförbund (Stockholm Football Association).

== History ==
=== 2003–2011: First edition ===
The team was founded in 2003 when Pröpa SK was renamed and reformed to Hammarby Talang FF. The last coach was Roger Franzén. The team played their final season of 2011 in the third tier of Swedish football, in Division 1 Norra, before being dissolved.

=== 2016–2020: Second edition ===
In 2016, Hammarby IF decided to form a new affiliated club with the name Hammarby Talang FF, focused on youth football for players between the age of 15 and 19. In 2019, they also established a senior team that played in Division 5 and Division 4, Sweden's seventh and sixth tier, for two seasons before being discontinued. The squads mostly consisted of older amateur players.

=== 2021–: Third edition ===
On 3 February 2021, the senior team of IK Frej changed its legal name to Stockholm TFF. After several years of financial difficulties, the board of IK Frej decided to withdraw from Division 1, the domestic third tier, to join Division 4 instead. Affiliated club Hammarby IF in Allsvenskan, which had provided resources in the form of funds and loaned players to IK Frej for several years, then decided to continue operations in a new form. The club's vision is to provide experience and training for young players, who can be temporarily loaned out and recalled.

The new name Stockholm TFF was, however, not accepted by the Stockholm Football Association since its abbreviation, STFF, was too similar to their own. On 4 March 2021, the board instead changed its name to Hammarby Talangfotbollsförening Herrfotboll, or Hammarby Talang FF for short, which was then re-incorporated.

== Players ==
=== First-team squad ===
As of 27 September 2026

Note: Flags indicate national team as defined under FIFA eligibility rules; some limited exceptions apply. Players may hold more than one non-FIFA nationality.

No.	Pos.	Nation	Player
1	GK	SWE	Elton Fischerström
2	DF	SWE	Essayas Lwampindy-Bofua
3	DF	SWE	Jesper Lindahl
4	DF	SWE	Casper Eklund
5	DF	GHA	Raymond Dwomoh
6	MF	LBR	Saah Moses Jr.
7	MF	SWE	Oskar Moczarny
8	MF	SWE	William Axelsson Tervonen
9	FW	SWE	Emil Sadarangani
10	FW	KOS	Granit Hana
11	MF	SWE	Adam Johansson
13	MF	SEN	Alwaly Camara
14	FW	ALB	Leart Krasniqi
15	FW	LBR	William Gibson

No.	Pos.	Nation	Player
16	MF	ALB	Gent Elezaj
17	DF	SWE	Oliver Corlin
18	DF	SWE	Björn Hedlöf
19	DF	SWE	Gustav Andrén
20	MF	SWE	Alfons Lohake
21	DF	SWE	Jonatan Oreland
23	DF	SWE	Noah Ek
24	MF	SWE	William Loqvist
25	MF	GAM	Modou Lamin Darboe
26	FW	SWE	Dennis Asprilla Ponce
27	DF	SWE	Oscar Fayli
28	MF	NGR	Imran Musa
35	GK	SWE	Gustav Nyberg

=== Out on loan ===
As of 27 September 2026

Note: Flags indicate national team as defined under FIFA eligibility rules; some limited exceptions apply. Players may hold more than one non-FIFA nationality.

No. / Pos. / Nation / Player; 10 / MF / SWE / Keyano Marrah (at Östers IF until 31 December 2026)	No. / Pos. / Nation / Player; 14 / DF / JPN / Yusei Shima (at Schwarz-Weiß Bregenz until 30 June 2027)

== Management ==
Position	Staff
Sporting director	(Sweden) Mikael Hjelmberg
Head coach	(Sweden) Fredrik Samuelsson
Assistant coach	(Sweden) Magnus Österberg
Goalkeeper coach	(Sweden) Mikael "Mille" Olsson
Fitness coach	(Sweden) Gustav Pettersson
Team administrator	(Sweden) Anders Mörk

== Season-to-season ==
=== First edition ===
Up until the 2011 season, Hammarby TFF had the following results:

Season	Level	League	Pos	Top goalscorer	
2003	Tier 4	Division 3 Östra Svealand	8th	Haris Laitinen	11
2004	Tier 4	Division 3 Östra Svealand	1st (P)	Vasilis Birbas	13
2005	Tier 3	Division 2 Östra Svealand	8th	Giannis Tsombos	11
2006 (Note: League restructuring in 2006 resulted in a new division being created at Tier 3 and subsequent divisions dropping a level)	Tier 4	Division 2 Östra Svealand	7th	Alagie Sosseh	11
2007	Tier 4	Division 2 Östra Svealand	10th	Christer Gustafsson	10
2008	Tier 4	Division 2 Södra Svealand	3rd	Alagie Sosseh	16
2009	Tier 4	Division 2 Södra Svealand	1st (P)	Christer Gustafsson	14
2010	Tier 3	Division 1 Norra	4th	Ivan Tedengren	10
2011	Tier 3	Division 1 Norra	12th	Elliot Käck	6

=== Second & Third edition ===
Season	Level	League	Pos	Top goalscorer	
2019	Tier 7	Division 5 Mellersta (Stockholm FF)	3rd	Alfred Cöster	17
2020	Tier 6	Division 4 Södra (Stockholm FF)	10th	Chiharu Stocklassa, Isac Widström	3
2021	Tier 3	Ettan Norra	12th	Jaheem Burke	6
2022	Tier 3	Ettan Norra	6th	Jusef Erabi	11
2023	Tier 3	Ettan Norra	9th	Deniz Gül	14
2024	Tier 3	Ettan Norra	4th	Adam Akimey	11
2025	Tier 3	Ettan Norra	2nd	Samuel Adindu	14

== Attendances ==
Up until the 2011 season, Hammarby TFF had the following average attendances:

Season	Average attendance	Division / Section	Level
2005	143	Div 2 Östra Svealand	Tier 3
2006	93	Div 2 Östra Svealand	Tier 4
2007	64	Div 2 Östra Svealand	Tier 4
2008	295	Div 2 Södra Svealand	Tier 4
2009	320	Div 2 Södra Svealand	Tier 4
2010	396	Div 1 Norra	Tier 3
2011	226	Div 1 Norra	Tier 3

* Attendances are provided in the Publikliga sections of the Svenska Fotbollförbundet website.
