= IF Brommapojkarna =

Association football club in Sweden

Brommapojkarna
- Full name: Idrottsföreningen Brommapojkarna
- Short name: BP
- Founded: 13 April 1942; 84 years ago
- Ground: Grimsta IP, Stockholm
- Capacity: 6,820
- Chairman: Fredrik Bergholm
- Head coach: Ulf Kristiansson
- League: Allsvenskan
- 2025: Allsvenskan, 12th
- Website: ifbp.se
Home colours	Away colours

Idrottsföreningen Brommapojkarna, more commonly known as Brommapojkarna (meaning The Bromma Boys) or simply BP, is a Swedish professional football club based in the borough of Bromma, in the western parts of Stockholm municipality. Brommapojkarna is the largest football club in Europe in terms of the number of active youth teams. The men's team plays in the Allsvenskan. The club is famous for its youth academy, which has produced numerous top-quality Swedish players throughout the years. It is affiliated to the Stockholms Fotbollförbund.

== History ==
The club was formed in 1942. It has earlier had many more sports on its programme, such as athletics, bandy and ice hockey.

They became affiliated with Manchester United after Bojan Djordjic was transferred to United in 1999. However, this deal has since expired as Brommapojkarna believed it would weaken talks with other Premier League clubs. The club now has a similar affiliation with local United rivals Manchester City, where former BP youth and Sweden International John Guidetti marked his trade, until his transfer to La Liga club Celta de Vigo in 2015.

The club was promoted to the Allsvenskan for the first time on 12 November 2006 after beating BK Häcken in the promotion-relegation play-offs. On 16 November 2008, the team reached Allsvenskan for the second time after a 1–1 draw against Ljungskile SK. It guaranteed remain in Allsvenskan for 2010 season despite losing 3–0 to home match against IFK Göteborg on 23 October 2009. In 2010, BP came in last and were relegated to Superettan, where they played in 2011 and 2012. In 2012 they finished 2nd in Superettan and were promoted to Allsvenskan for the third time.

== Players ==
=== First-team squad ===
As of 3 September 2026

Note: Flags indicate national team as defined under FIFA eligibility rules; some limited exceptions apply. Players may hold more than one non-FIFA nationality.

No.	Pos.	Nation	Player
1	GK	SWE	Leo Cavallius
2	DF	SWE	Pavle Vagić
3	DF	DEN	Andreas Troelsen
4	DF	SWE	Oskar Cotton
5	MF	GAB	Serge-Junior Martinsson Ngouali
6	DF	SWE	Oliver Zandén
7	FW	NOR	Obilor Okeke
9	FW	DEN	Mads Hansen
10	MF	NOR	Oliver Berg
11	MF	SWE	Rasmus Örqvist
12	FW	NGR	Bidemi Amole
13	DF	SWE	Emir El-Kathemi
14	FW	TUR	Kamilcan Sever
16	FW	CRO	Luka Petrović
17	FW	SWE	Anton Kurochkin

No.	Pos.	Nation	Player
20	MF	SWE	Wilmer Odefalk
21	DF	SWE	Simon Strand
22	DF	SWE	Rasmus Bergvall
23	DF	SWE	Jordan Simpson
24	MF	TUN	Wael Derbali
25	GK	SWE	Davor Blažević
26	DF	GHA	Baba Salifu Apiiga
27	DF	DEN	Kaare Barslund
28	FW	NGR	Courage Otokwefor
29	FW	GHA	Evans Botchway
30	MF	SWE	Lukas Björklund
32	MF	SWE	Atle Wahlund
34	FW	SWE	David Isso
40	GK	SWE	John-Oliver Lacayo
-	FW	DEN	Abdul Daramy (on loan from Copenhagen U19)

=== Out on loan ===
Note: Flags indicate national team as defined under FIFA eligibility rules; some limited exceptions apply. Players may hold more than one non-FIFA nationality.

No.	Pos.	Nation	Player
2	DF	ISL	Hlynur Freyr Karlsson (at Breiðablik until 31 December 2026)
8	MF	SWE	Adam Stroud (at IFK Mariehamn until 31 December 2026)
15	MF	SEN	El Hadji Fallou Faye (at Enköpings SK until 30 November 2026)

No.	Pos.	Nation	Player
18	FW	SWE	Elton Hedström (at Ljungskile SK until 30 November 2026)
19	MF	SWE	Oskar Jarde (at FC Stockholm until 30 November 2026)
—	FW	SWE	Carlos Jacinto (at Nacka FC until 30 November 2026)

=== Notable players ===
List criteria:

- player has been inducted into the official "Hall of Fame" of IF Brommapojkarna.

Name	Nationality	Position	Brommapojkarna career	Total appearances	Total goals	Year of induction
Bo Lundberg	Sweden	Forward	1971–1981	212	67	2014
Kjell Jonevret	Sweden	Forward	1979–1983; 1985–1987	163	96	2014
Anders Limpar	Sweden	Midfielder	1981–1986; 2000–2002	96	23	2014
Olof Guterstam	Sweden	Forward	2002–2007; 2009–2010	211	54	2014
Pontus Segerström	Sweden	Defender	1998–2004; 2010–2014	245	8	2015
Sten-Ove Ramberg	Sweden	Midfielder	1973–1978	119	12	2015
Jon Persson	Sweden	Defender	2000–2009	237	10	2015
Berndt Magnusson	Sweden	Goalkeeper	1985–1997	271	0	2016
Daniel Majstorović	Sweden	Defender	1986–1997	34	1	2016
Björn Jonasson	Sweden	Goalkeeper	1958–1972	208	11	2017
Per Ferm	Sweden	Forward	1985–1990; 1992–1996	234	70	2017
Jan Seipel	Sweden	Forward	1965–1974; 1979	178	62	2018
Bengt-Erik Gårdefors	Sweden	Forward	1977–1985	177	76	2018
Tomas Antonelius	Sweden	Defender	1991–1996	103	4	2018
Dejan Kulusevski	Sweden	Forward/Midfielder	2006–2016			

== European record ==
Season	Competition	Round	Club	Home	Away	Aggregate
2014–15	UEFA Europa League	1Q	(Finland) VPS	2–0	1–2	3–2
2014–15	UEFA Europa League	2Q	(Northern Ireland) Crusaders	4–0	1–1	5–1
2014–15	UEFA Europa League	3Q	(Italy) Torino	0–3	0–4	0–7

Notes

- 1Q: First qualifying round
- 2Q: Second qualifying round
- 3Q: Third qualifying round

== Season to season ==
Season	Level	Division	Section	Position	Movements
2003	Tier 2	Superettan		6th	
2004	Tier 2	Superettan		10th	
2005	Tier 2	Superettan		6th	
2006	Tier 2	Superettan		3rd	Promotion Playoff – Promoted
2007	Tier 1	Allsvenskan		14th	Relegated
2008	Tier 2	Superettan		3rd	Promotion Playoff – Promoted
2009	Tier 1	Allsvenskan		12th	
2010	Tier 1	Allsvenskan		16th	Relegated
2011	Tier 2	Superettan		6th	
2012	Tier 2	Superettan		2nd	Promoted
2013	Tier 1	Allsvenskan		13th	
2014	Tier 1	Allsvenskan		16th	Relegated
2015	Tier 2	Superettan		16th	Relegated
2016	Tier 3	Division 1	Norra	1st	Promoted
2017	Tier 2	Superettan		1st	Promoted
2018	Tier 1	Allsvenskan		14th	Relegation Playoff – Relegated
2019	Tier 2	Superettan		15th	Relegated
2020	Tier 3	Division 1	Norra	2nd	Promotion Playoff – Not promoted
2021	Tier 3	Division 1	Norra	1st	Promoted
2022	Tier 2	Superettan		1st	Promoted
2023	Tier 1	Allsvenskan		14th	Relegation Playoff – Not relegated
2024	Tier 1	Allsvenskan		10th	
2025	Tier 1	Allsvenskan		12th	

* League restructuring in 2006 resulted in a new division being created at Tier 3 and subsequent divisions dropping a level.

== Attendances ==
In recent seasons IF Brommapojkarna have had the following average attendances:

Season	Average attendance	Division / Section	Level
2003	825	Superettan	Tier 2
2004	855	Superettan	Tier 2
2005	1,242	Superettan	Tier 2
2006	1,144	Superettan	Tier 2
2007	4,571	Allsvenskan	Tier 1
2008	949	Superettan	Tier 2
2009	2,860	Allsvenskan	Tier 1
2010	2,262	Allsvenskan	Tier 1
2011	1,065	Superettan	Tier 2
2012	1,239	Superettan	Tier 2
2013	1,532	Allsvenskan	Tier 1
2014	1,327	Allsvenskan	Tier 1
2015	888	Superettan	Tier 2
2016	532	Division 1 Norra	Tier 3
2017	1,159	Superettan	Tier 2
2018	2,307	Allsvenskan	Tier 1
2019	561	Superettan	Tier 2
2020	27	Division 1 Norra	Tier 3
2021	216	Division 1 Norra	Tier 3

* Attendances are provided in the Publikliga sections of the Svenska Fotbollförbundet website.

== Honours ==
- Superettan:
  - Winners (2): 2017, 2022
  - Runners-up (1): 2012
- Division 1 Norra:
  - Winners (1): 2016
- Division 2 Östra Svealand:
  - Winners (3): 1998, 2000, 2001

== Managers ==
- (Sweden) Gösta Sandberg (1959–61)
- (Sweden) Henry Carlsson (1969–71)
- (Sweden) Gösta Sandberg (1972–78)
- (Sweden) Tommy Söderberg (1982–85)
- (Sweden) Thomas Lyth (1986–89)
- (Sweden) Erik Hamrén (1990–91)
- (Sweden) Dan Sundblad (1991–93)
- (Sweden) Bo Petersson (1994)
- (Sweden) Kjell Jonevret (1995)
- (Sweden) Thomas Lyth (1995–97)
- (Finland) Jari Pyykölä (1998–99)
- (Sweden) Dan Sundblad (1999)
- (Sweden) Benny Persson (2000–03)
- (Sweden) Anders Grönhagen (1 January 2004 – 31 December 2004)
- (Sweden) Claes Eriksson (1 January 2005 – 31 December 2007)
- (Sweden) Kim Bergstrand (2008–10)
- (Sweden) Roberth Björknesjö (1 October 2010 – 30 November 2013)
- (Sweden) Stefan Billborn (2013–14)
- (Sweden) Magni Fannberg Magnússon (2014–15)
- (Sweden) Olof Mellberg (27 November 2015 – 21 November 2017)
- (Portugal) Luís Pimenta (13 December 2017 – 5 September 2018)
- (Sweden) Roberth Björknesjö (10 September 2010 – 31 August 2019)
- (Sweden) Kjell Jonevret (1 September 2019 – 30 November 2019)
- (England) Shaun Constable (1 December 2019 – 31 December 2020)
- (Sweden) Christer Mattiasson (1 January 2021 – 31 December 2022)
- (Sweden) Olof Mellberg & (Sweden) Andreas Engelmark (1 January 2023 – 31 December 2024)
- (Sweden) Ulf Kristiansson & (Sweden) Fredrik Landen (1 January 2025 – 31 December 2025)
- (Sweden) Ulf Kristiansson (1 January 2026–)
