= 2026 Allsvenskan =

Football league season in Sweden

Allsvenskan
- Season: 2026
- Dates: 4 April 2026 – 29 November 2026
- Top goalscorer: Paulos Abraham; Kristian Lien (17 goals each)
- Biggest home win: Hammarby IF 8–1 Örgryte IS (18 April 2026)
- Biggest away win: Kalmar FF 0–5 BK Häcken (20 September 2026)
- Highest scoring: AIK 5–6 IF Brommapojkarna (10 October 2026)
- Longest winning run: 5 matches IK Sirius; IFK Göteborg; Hammarby IF
- Longest unbeaten run: 16 matches IK Sirius
- Longest winless run: 11 matches Degerfors IF
- Longest losing run: 5 matches Degerfors IF; Kalmar FF
- Highest attendance: 46,278; AIK 2–4 Djurgårdens IF (10 May 2026)
- Lowest attendance: 817; IF Brommapojkarna 1–0 Kalmar FF (17 May 2026)
- All statistics correct as of 24 May 2026.

The 2026 Allsvenskan is the 102nd season since its establishment in 1924 of Sweden's top-level men's football league, Allsvenskan. The season began on 5 April 2026 and will end in November 2026 (not including relegation play-off matches).

Mjällby AIF were the reigning champions, having won their first title in the previous season. However, they failed to defend their title.

== Teams ==
The league consists of sixteen teams: the top thirteen sides from the previous season and three teams promoted from the 2025 Superettan. The promoted teams were Västerås SK, Kalmar FF (both promoted after a single year absence) and Örgryte IS (promoted after 16 seasons of absence), replacing relegated Allsvenskan teams Östers IF, IFK Värnamo and IFK Norrköping, who have played in the top division for 1, 4 and 15 seasons respectively prior to relegation. Mjällby AIF will enter the season as defending champions.

Location of teams in the 2026 Allsvenskan
Allsvenskan clubs in Stockholm County
Allsvenskan clubs in Gothenburg

=== Stadiums and locations ===
Team	Location	Stadium	Turf	Stadium capacity
AIK	Solna	Nationalarenan (Note: Known as Strawberry Arena for sponsorship reasons.)	Natural	50,000
BK Häcken	Gothenburg	Nordic Wellness Arena	Artificial	6,316
Degerfors IF	Degerfors	Stora Valla	Natural	5,880
Djurgårdens IF	Stockholm	3Arena	Artificial	30,000
GAIS	Gothenburg	Gamla Ullevi	Natural	18,454
Halmstads BK	Halmstad	Örjans Vall	Natural	10,873
Hammarby IF	Stockholm	3Arena	Artificial	30,000
IF Brommapojkarna	Stockholm	Grimsta IP	Artificial	5,000
IF Elfsborg	Borås	Borås Arena	Artificial	16,200
IFK Göteborg	Gothenburg	Gamla Ullevi	Natural	18,454
IK Sirius	Uppsala	Studenternas IP	Artificial	10,522
Kalmar FF	Kalmar	Guldfågeln Arena	Natural	12,150
Malmö FF	Malmö	Stadion (Note: Known as Eleda Stadion for sponsorship reasons.)	Natural	22,500
Mjällby AIF	Hällevik	Strandvallen	Natural	7,500
Örgryte IS	Gothenburg	Gamla Ullevi	Natural	18,454
Västerås SK	Västerås	Hitachi Energy Arena	Artificial	8,900

=== Personnel and kits ===
All teams are obligated to have the logo of the league sponsor Unibet as well as the Allsvenskan logo on the right sleeve of their shirt.

Note: Flags indicate national team as has been defined under FIFA eligibility rules. Players and Managers may hold more than one non-FIFA nationality.

Team	Head coach	Captain	Kit manufacturer	Sponsors	
Team	Head coach	Captain	Kit manufacturer	Main	Other(s)
AIK	(Spain) José Riveiro	(Sweden) Kristoffer Nordfeldt	(United States) Nike	Truecaller	List: Front: Craftor; Back: Svea Bank; Sleeves: Stadium Sverige; Shorts: Volkswagen; Socks: None
BK Häcken	(Sweden) Jens Gustafsson	(Denmark) Mikkel Rygaard	(Germany) Puma	BRA Bygg	List: Front: Volkswagen, Sankt Jörgen Park, Nordic Wellness; Back: Gevab Group, Brion Gruppen, Prefabsystem Syd; Sleeves: Stadium Sverige; Shorts: Varis Förvaltning, Länsförsäkringar Göteborg och Bohus, Demo Group, K-Bygg; Socks: Maxxis Tyres
Degerfors IF	(Eritrea) Henok Goitom	(Sweden) Daniel Sundgren	(England) Umbro	Helmia	List: Front: Helmia; Back: Sleeves: Shorts: Socks:
Djurgårdens IF	(Hungary) Ábel Lőrincz (Albania) Agon Mehmeti	(Finland) Adam Ståhl	(Germany) Adidas	Mobill Parkering	List: Front: Nordic Wellness; Back: Sundström Safety, TCL Technology; Sleeves: Stadium Sverige; Shorts: Volkswagen; Socks: None
GAIS	(Sweden) Fredrik Holmberg	(Sweden) August Wängberg	(Denmark) Select	ITS Indeship	List: Front: SKAB Gruppen, Good Advice Sverige; Back: Nordic Wellness, various; Sleeves: Stadium Sverige; Shorts: AVIX, Safe Scaff, Åke Ekstrand Byggnads, Good Advice Sverige, Folie & Papper, Bostjärnan, Länsförsäkringar Göteborg och Bohus; Socks: None
Halmstads BK	(Scotland) Stuart Baxter	(France) Rocco Ascone	(Italy) Macron	Jonab	List: Front: Cityfastigheter, Getinge, Sportringen, ClickitUp; Back: EAB AB, Östras Stenugnsbageriet; Sleeves: HFAB; Shorts: Volkswagen MotorHalland, Jonab Anläggnings, Villalivet, Länsförsäkringar Halland; Socks: GN Transport
Hammarby IF	(Sweden) Henrik Rydström	(Sweden) Nahir Besara	(Sweden) Craft	Projob Workwear	List: Front: Nordic Wellness, Intersport, Sesol Jönköping; Back: Sefina Pantbank; Sleeves: Berges Schakt & Transport; Shorts: Volkswagen, J&S Markservice; Socks: Clinton Mätkonsult
IF Brommapojkarna	(Sweden) Ulf Kristiansson	(Sweden) Simon Strand	(United States) Nike	Bredbandsval.se	List: Front: Nöjd AB, Nordic Wellness; Back: None; Sleeves: Stadium Sverige; Shorts: Norteam, Bauhaus, Stora Coop; Socks: None
IF Elfsborg	(Sweden) Björn Hamberg	(Sweden) Sebastian Holmén	(England) Umbro	Sparbanken Sjuhärad	List: Front: Volkswagen Toveks Bil, Effektiv, RO-Gruppen, Input interior, Borås; Back: Pulsen Group, Rudholm Group; Sleeves: Musiklagret, Autocirc; Shorts: Infrakraft, Ellos, Skrotfrag, C Land Logistics, EAB, Cernera Fastigheter; Socks: SGA Conveyor System
IFK Göteborg	(Sweden) Joachim Björklund	(Sweden) August Erlingmark	(Sweden) Craft	Serneke	List: Front: Serneke, Fameco, Merinfo; Back: Nordic Wellness, Mobill; Sleeves: None; Shorts: MG Motor; Socks: None
IK Sirius	(Sweden) Andreas Engelmark	(Sweden) Henrik Castegren	(Denmark) Select	ByggConstruct	List: Front: Toyo Tires, Sfär, Högbergs Buss, ICA Supermarket Luthagens Livs, Maskin & Verktyg; Back: Årsta Tak, Nordic Wellness, inkClub; Sleeves: Unisport; Shorts: Upplands Bilforum, Länsförsäkringar Uppsala, Elak AB, Team G El & VVS AB, Vaksala Måleri, ServeYou AB; Socks: None
Kalmar FF	(Finland) Toni Koskela	(Sweden) Melker Hallberg	(Denmark) Select	(Sweden) Mjlti Bygg	List: Front: Mjlti Bygg; Back: Redeye; Sleeves: Unibet; Shorts: Cupra; Socks:
Malmö FF	(Norway) Gaute Helstrup	(Denmark) Anders Christiansen	(Germany) Puma	Oatly	List: Front: Oatly; Back: Tillmobil; Sleeves: Boozt, Sparbanken Skåne; Shorts: None; Socks: None
Mjällby AIF	(Sweden) Andreas Brännström	(Sweden) Jesper Gustavsson	(Italy) Macron	Mellby Gård	List: Front: Kundpartner, Maxi ICA Stormarknad, Sölvesborg, Sydställningar, Enkla Elbolaget; Back: Järletoft Bygger; Sleeves: Falkeskog; Shorts: Säljfast, Volkswagen, Sölvesborg hjärta för bygden, SVB Industri, Mercedes-Benz Råbergs Bil, Extra Mjällby; Socks: None
Örgryte IS	(Sweden) Andreas Holmberg	(Sweden) Daniel Paulson	(England) Umbro		List: Front: NTex; Back: Sleeves: Shorts: Socks:
Västerås SK	(Sweden) Alexander Rubin	(Burundi) Frédéric Nsabiyumva	(Germany) Puma		List: Front: Back: Sleeves: Shorts: Socks:

=== Managerial changes ===
Team	Outgoing manager	Manner of departure	Date of vacancy	Table	Incoming manager	Date of appointment
Mjällby AIF	(Sweden) Anders Torstensson	Promoted to technical director	18 November 2025	Pre-season	(Norway) Karl Marius Aksum	18 November 2025
Västerås SK	(Sweden) Kalle Karlsson	Mutual consent	19 November 2025	Pre-season	(Sweden) Alexander Rubin	19 November 2025
Hammarby IF	(Sweden) Kim Hellberg	Signed by Middlesbrough	24 November 2025	Pre-season	(Sweden) Kalle Karlsson	8 December 2025
Malmö FF	(Sweden) Anes Mravac	End of interim spell	11 December 2025	Pre-season	(Spain) Miguel Ángel Ramírez	2 December 2025
AIK	(Faroe Islands) Mikkjal Thomassen	Sacked	4 January 2026	Pre-season	(Spain) José Riveiro	16 January 2026
IF Elfsborg	(Sweden) Oscar Hiljemark	Signed by Pisa	3 February 2026	Pre-season	(Sweden) Björn Hamberg	19 February 2026
Halmstads BK	(Sweden) Johan Lindholm	Sacked	5 May 2026	16th	(Scotland) Stuart Baxter	7 May 2026
Malmö FF	(Spain) Miguel Ángel Ramírez	Sacked	26 May 2026	12th	(Norway) Gaute Helstrup	30 June 2026
Hammarby IF	(Sweden) Kalle Karlsson	Sacked	5 June 2026	4th	(Sweden) Henrik Rydström	5 June 2026
IFK Göteborg	(Sweden) Stefan Billborn	Sacked	27 July 2026	13th	(Sweden) Joachim Björklund	27 July 2026
Mjällby AIF	(Norway) Karl Marius Aksum	Sacked	8 September 2026	12th	(Sweden) Andreas Brännström	8 September 2026
Djurgårdens IF	(Finland) Jani Honkavaara	Sacked	10 November 2026	3rd	(Hungary) Ábel Lőrincz (interim) (Albania) Agon Mehmeti (interim)	10 November 2026

== League table ==
Pos	Team	Pld	W	D	L	GF	GA	GD	Pts	Qualification or relegation
1	IK Sirius (X)	29	19	4	6	59	35	+24	61	Qualification for the Champions League second qualifying round
2	Hammarby IF (X)	28	18	4	6	60	23	+37	58	Qualification for the Conference League second qualifying round
3	Djurgårdens IF	29	16	4	9	56	28	+28	52	Qualification for the Conference League second qualifying round
4	BK Häcken	29	14	10	5	52	34	+18	52	
5	IF Elfsborg	29	12	10	7	43	33	+10	46	
6	Västerås SK	29	13	6	10	41	41	0	45	
7	GAIS	29	12	7	10	39	29	+10	43	
8	Malmö FF	29	12	6	11	43	37	+6	42	
9	AIK	29	11	9	9	46	49	−3	42	
10	IFK Göteborg	28	10	9	9	36	46	−10	39	
11	IF Brommapojkarna	29	9	8	12	39	47	−8	35	
12	Mjällby AIF	29	6	11	12	31	44	−13	29	
13	Kalmar FF	28	7	5	16	24	42	−18	26	
14	Halmstads BK	29	6	5	18	23	52	−29	23	Qualification for the Allsvenskan play-off
15	Degerfors IF (Y)	29	5	6	18	23	48	−25	21	Relegation to Superettan
16	Örgryte IS	28	4	8	16	33	60	−27	20	Relegation to Superettan

Updated to match(es) played on 22 November 2026. Source: svenskfotboll.se (in Swedish)
Rules for classification: 1) Points; 2) Goal difference; 3) Goals scored; 4) Head-to-head points; 5) Head-to-head goal difference; 6) Head-to-head away goals scored; 7) Play-off
(Note: Play-off is only played if need to decide champion, teams for relegation or UEFA competition and will be played on a neutral ground).
(X) Guaranteed at least UEFA Conference League; (Y) Can at best reach Allsvenskan play-off

== Positions by round ==
Team ╲ Round	1	2	3	4	5	6	7	8	9	10	11	12	13	14	15	16	17	18	19	20	21	22	23	24	25	26	27	28	29	30
Hammarby IF	1	9	6	4	5	2	2	2	2	3	2	2	2	2	3	2	2	2	2	3	3	2	3	3	2	2	2	1		
IK Sirius	2	1	1	1	1	1	1	1	1	1	1	1	1	1	1	1	1	1	1	1	1	1	1	1	1	1	1	2		
Djurgårdens IF	5	3	7	8	8	4	4	5	7	5	4	3	3	3	2	3	3	3	3	2	2	3	2	2	3	3	3	3	3	
BK Häcken	8	2	2	3	4	5	5	3	3	2	3	4	4	4	4	4	4	4	6	5	6	5	5	4	4	4	4	4	4	
IF Elfsborg	3	4	3	2	2	3	3	4	4	4	5	8	8	8	8	7	6	6	5	6	4	4	4	5	5	5	5	5	5	
Västerås SK	6	8	8	9	6	11	12	12	9	11	9	6	7	5	7	6	8	8	8	8	8	6	7	6	6	6	6	6	6	
GAIS	12	13	16	16	15	12	8	9	12	9	11	9	9	9	9	8	9	10	9	9	10	10	10	10	11	10	10	9	7	
Malmö FF	9	5	4	5	3	6	7	8	11	8	6	5	6	7	5	9	7	7	7	7	5	7	6	7	7	7	7	7	8	
AIK	4	7	5	6	9	9	9	10	8	10	10	7	5	6	6	5	5	5	4	4	7	8	9	9	8	8	8	8	9	
IFK Göteborg	14	15	14	14	14	15	15	14	14	14	14	14	13	13	13	10	12	12	11	11	9	9	8	8	9	9	9	10	10	
IF Brommapojkarna	7	11	12	10	11	10	10	7	6	6	7	10	11	11	12	12	10	9	10	10	11	11	11	11	10	11	11	11	11	11
Mjällby AIF	16	16	11	11	10	7	6	6	5	7	8	11	10	12	11	13	11	11	12	12	12	12	12	12	12	12	12	12		
Kalmar FF	13	12	15	15	13	14	13	13	10	13	12	12	12	10	10	11	13	13	13	13	13	13	14	13	13	13	13	13		
Halmstads BK	11	14	13	13	16	16	16	16	15	15	15	16	16	16	16	16	16	16	16	16	16	16	16	16	16	16	16	16		
Degerfors IF	15	10	10	7	7	8	11	11	13	12	13	13	14	14	15	14	14	14	14	14	14	14	13	14	14	14	14	14		
Örgryte IS	10	6	9	12	12	13	14	15	16	16	16	15	15	15	14	15	15	15	15	15	15	15	15	15	15	15	15	15		

Leader and 2027–28 UEFA Champions League second qualifying round
2027–28 UEFA Conference League second qualifying round
Allsvenskan play-off
Relegation to 2027 Superettan

Updated to match(es) played on 22 November 2026. Source: everysport.com

== Results by round ==
Team ╲ Round	1	2	3	4	5	6	7	8	9	10	11	12	13	14	15	16	17	18	19	20	21	22	23	24	25	26	27	28	29	30
AIK	W	D	W	L	L	D	L	D	W	L	W	W	W	D	L	W	W	D	W	D	L	L	L	D	W	D	L	W	D	
BK Häcken	D	W	W	D	D	D	W	W	D	W	L	L	W	D	D	L	W	W	L	D	D	W	W	W	W	D	W	L	W	
IF Brommapojkarna	D	D	L	W	L	W	L	W	W	D	D	L	L	D	L	D	W	W	L	W	L	L	W	L	W	D	L	D	L	
Degerfors IF	L	W	L	W	D	D	L	D	L	D	L	L	L	L	L	W	W	L	L	W	L	L	D	L	L	L	L	L	D	
Djurgårdens IF	W	W	L	L	D	W	W	L	L	W	W	W	D	W	W	L	L	W	W	W	W	L	W	W	D	D	W	L	L	
GAIS	L	L	L	D	D	W	W	D	L	W	D	W	L	D	W	W	L	L	W	D	L	W	L	L	D	W	W	W	W	
Halmstads BK	L	L	D	D	L	L	L	D	W	L	L	L	L	D	L	L	L	D	W	L	L	W	L	L	W	L	L	W	W	
Hammarby IF	W	L	W	D	D	W	W	W	L	L	W	W	W	D	L	W	W	W	L	D	W	W	L	W	W	W	W	W		
IF Elfsborg	W	D	W	W	L	D	W	D	D	D	L	L	L	W	D	W	W	D	W	L	W	W	W	D	D	D	W	L	L	
IFK Göteborg	L	L	D	D	D	L	L	W	D	W	L	L	W	L	W	W	L	D	W	W	W	W	W	D	D	D	L	D		
IK Sirius	W	W	W	W	D	W	W	W	W	W	D	W	W	W	W	D	L	L	L	W	W	W	W	D	L	L	W	L	W	
Kalmar FF	L	L	L	D	W	L	W	L	W	L	W	L	D	W	D	L	L	D	L	L	L	L	L	W	L	L	D	W		
Malmö FF	D	W	W	L	W	L	L	L	L	W	W	W	D	L	W	L	W	L	W	D	W	L	W	L	D	W	L	D	D	
Mjällby AIF	L	L	W	D	W	W	W	L	D	L	D	L	D	L	D	L	W	D	L	L	D	L	D	L	L	W	D	D	D	
Västerås SK	W	D	L	D	W	L	L	D	W	L	W	W	D	W	L	W	L	D	W	L	W	W	L	W	L	W	W	D	L	
Örgryte IS	D	W	L	L	D	L	L	L	L	D	L	W	D	L	W	L	L	D	L	D	L	L	L	W	D	L	L	D		

Updated to match(es) played on 22 November 2026. Source: Soccerstats.com (in English)
W = Win; D = Draw; L = Lose; P = Postponed

== Results ==
Home \ Away	AIK	BKH	DEG	DIF	GAIS	HBK	HAM	BP	IFE	IFKG	IKS	KFF	MFF	MAIF	VSK	ÖIS
AIK		3–2	0–0	2–4	2–0	2–1	3–2	5–6	2–2	2–2	0–3	1–0	0–1	1–1	1–4	0–3
BK Häcken	0–0		4–0	2–4	2–1	1–0	3–2	2–2	2–1	1–0	2–2	1–1	3–2	1–1	1–3	3–0
Degerfors IF	2–1	1–1		0–1	1–2	2–0	0–1	2–2	0–1	3–0	0–3	1–2	0–1	1–4	0–3	
Djurgårdens IF	1–3		2–1		2–0	3–0	1–1	1–2	1–2	6–0	2–3	3–2	0–1	4–0	6–0	2–2
GAIS	2–1	0–0	1–1	0–1		1–1	2–0	4–0	1–0	1–1	0–1	3–0	0–1	0–0	3–1	4–0
Halmstads BK	2–1	0–2	0–3	2–1	0–2		0–1	1–3	1–1	1–1	0–2	1–0	0–3		1–3	2–0
Hammarby IF	1–2	3–0	4–0	0–1	2–0	1–1		3–1	4–1		2–0	2–0	4–1	3–0	3–0	8–1
IF Brommapojkarna	2–2	0–0	2–0	0–2	1–1	0–3	1–1		2–1	0–1	1–2	1–0	1–2	0–0	1–2	3–1
IF Elfsborg	1–1	1–1	2–0	2–1		4–0	1–2	2–0		2–0	1–3	1–0	0–0	1–1	3–0	2–1
IFK Göteborg	1–2	0–2	2–0	1–1	2–2	2–1	0–1	2–1	1–1			3–2	0–0	1–1	1–0	1–0
IK Sirius	1–2	0–3	2–0	1–0	2–1	2–0	2–0	2–2	2–2	4–1		3–2	0–1	4–4	4–1	2–0
Kalmar FF		0–5	2–1	0–1	0–1	2–0	0–4	0–3	2–1	1–1	1–0		2–2	2–1	0–1	3–0
Malmö FF	0–0	0–1	1–2	0–3	3–1	5–2	1–2		1–2	4–0	2–3	1–0		2–3	2–3	4–1
Mjällby AIF	1–2	0–1	1–1	0–2	0–3	2–0	0–2	3–0	0–1	1–4	4–3	0–0	1–1		0–0	0–2
Västerås SK	1–1	3–3	2–0	1–0	0–1	1–2		1–0	2–2	4–5	0–1	0–0	2–0	1–0		2–0
Örgryte IS	3–4	4–3	1–1	0–0	4–2	1–1	1–1	1–2	2–2	2–3	1–2		1–1	1–2	0–0	

Updated to match(es) played on 22 November 2026. Source: Svenskfotboll.se
Legend: Blue = home team win; Yellow = draw; Red = away team win.
For upcoming matches, an "a" indicates there is an article about the rivalry between the two participants.

== Allsvenskan play-off ==
In Round 1, the third- and fourth-placed teams from 2026 Superettan will face each other. The winner will then face the 14th-placed team from Allsvenskan in Round 2. Both rounds are played as two-legged ties on a home-and-away basis.

Round 1
Östersunds FK	0
Varbergs BoIS	2

Round 2
Allsvenskan 14th-placed team

=== Round 1 ===
21 November 2026
13:00

Östersunds FK	0–2	Varbergs BoIS
	Report	Winbo 44'; Brynéus 89'

Jämtkraft Arena, Östersund
Attendance: 3,776
Referee: Niclas Karlsson
28 November 2026
13:00

Varbergs BoIS	v	Östersunds FK

Påskbergsvallen, Varberg

== Season statistics ==
=== Top scorers ===
As of 22 November 2026

Rank	Player	Club	Goals
1	(Sweden) Paulos Abraham	Hammarby IF	17
1	(Norway) Kristian Lien	Djurgårdens IF	17
3	(Sweden) Isak Bjerkebo	IK Sirius	15
3	(Scotland) Robbie Ure	IK Sirius	15
5	(Sweden) Gustav Lindgren	BK Häcken	14
6	(Norway) Bo Hegland	Djurgårdens IF	11
6	(Norway) Johan Hove	AIK	11
6	(Sweden) Leo Östman	IF Elfsborg	11

Players in italics left the team during the season.

=== Hat-tricks ===
Player	For	Against	Result	Date
(Sweden) Paulos Abraham	Hammarby IF	Mjällby AIF	3-0	4 April 2026
(Sweden) Nahir Besara	Hammarby IF	Malmö FF	4–1	17 May 2026
(Norway) Erik Botheim	Malmö FF	Halmstads BK	5–2	30 May 2026
(Norway) Tobias Heintz (4)	IFK Göteborg	Västerås SK	5–4	31 May 2026
(Scotland) Robbie Ure (4)	IK Sirius	Mjällby AIF	4–4	3 July 2026
(Sweden) Noah Christoffersson	Örgryte IS	AIK	3–0	2 August 2026
(Norway) Kristian Lien	Djurgårdens IF	Västerås SK	6–0	3 August 2026
(Sweden) Gustav Lindgren	BK Häcken	Kalmar FF	5–0	20 September 2026

=== Discipline ===
==== Player ====
- Most yellow cards: 10
  - (Sweden) William Milovanovic, GAIS
- Most red cards: 1
  - (Sweden) Axel Norén, Mjällby AIF
  - (Guinea) Mohamed Soumah, IK Sirius
  - (Ghana) Rockson Yeboah, IFK Göteborg
  - (Montenegro) Andrej Đurić, Malmö FF

==== Club ====
- Most yellow cards:
- Most red cards:

== Awards ==
=== Monthly awards ===
The Player of the Month award is presented seven times during the season. The jury consists of 16 team captains and head coaches, along with sports journalists from national and local media in the regions where Allsvenskan is played. Each month, the jury selects five finalists, after which supporters vote to determine the winner among them.

Month	Player of the Month		Coach of the Month		References
Month	Player	Club	Coach	Club	References
April	(Sweden) Isak Bjerkebo	IK Sirius	(Sweden) Andreas Engelmark	IK Sirius	
May	(Sweden) Isak Bjerkebo	IK Sirius	(Sweden) Andreas Engelmark	IK Sirius	
July	(Scotland) Robbie Ure	IK Sirius	(Sweden) Andreas Engelmark	IK Sirius	
August	(Sweden) Linus Carlstrand	AIK	(Spain) José Riveiro	AIK	
September	(Sweden) Sam Larsson	IFK Göteborg	(Sweden) Joachim Björklund	IFK Göteborg	
October	(Albania) Etrit Berisha	BK Häcken	(Sweden) Jens Gustafsson	BK Häcken	
November					

== Attendances ==
Allsvenskan clubs listed by average home league attendance during the 2026 season after the first few rounds of the season:

Pos	Club	Games	Average attendance
1	AIK	13	30,194
2	Hammarby IF	13	25,915
3	Djurgårdens IF	14	22,480
4	Malmö FF	14	18,233
5	IFK Göteborg	13	16,480
6	GAIS	13	10,595
7	IK Sirius	13	9,471
8	Örgryte IS	13	8,078
9	IF Elfsborg	14	8,002
10	Västerås SK	14	6,333
11	Kalmar FF	13	5,465
12	Halmstads BK	13	5,322
13	BK Häcken	14	4,772
14	Mjällby AIF	13	4,411
15	Degerfors IF	13	4,349
16	IF Brommapojkarna	13	2,202

== See also ==
Competitions

- 2026 Superettan
- 2026 Ettan
- 2025–26 Svenska Cupen
- 2026–27 Svenska Cupen

Team seasons

- 2026 Djurgårdens IF season
- 2026 IFK Göteborg season
- 2026 Malmö FF season
