= William Milovanovic =

Swedish footballer (born 2002)

Personal information
- Date of birth: 6 May 2002 (age 24)
- Height: 1.81 m (5 ft 11 in)
- Position: Midfielder

Team information
- Current team: GAIS
- Number: 8

Youth career
- IF Warta
- Eriksbergs IF
- 2014–2020: BK Häcken

Senior career*
Years	Team	Apps	(Gls)
2021–2022	BK Häcken	2	(0)
2021	→ Norrby IF (loan)	13	(0)
2022	→ Utsiktens BK (loan)	26	(0)
2023	NK Koper	5	(0)
2023	Utsiktens BK	11	(3)
2024–	GAIS	58	(4)

International career
2018	Sweden U16	2	(0)
2018–2019	Sweden U17	10	(0)
- * Club domestic league appearances and goals as of 8 July 2026

William Milovanovic (born 6 May 2002) is a Swedish professional footballer who plays as a midfielder for Allsvenskan club GAIS.

== Career ==
Milovanovic hails from Biskopsgården in Hisingen, Gothenburg. He started his youth career in IF Warta and Eriksbergs IF before joining BK Häcken at the age of 12, where he continued progressing through the academy ranks. A Sweden youth international, he participated in the 2019 UEFA European Under-17 Championship. He made his senior debut for Häcken in the 2020–21 Svenska Cupen, playing all three group matches as well as the semi-final against Västerås, all in February and March 2021. He then made his Allsvenskan debut in May 2021 against Örebro.

However, his senior career in Häcken did not last long. Following loans to Norrby IF in 2021 and Utsiktens BK in 2022, he had to leave Häcken. Milovanovic first opted for a transfer to the Slovenian club NK Koper. After playing a handful of games there, he returned to Utsiktens BK where he played the latter half of the 2023 Superettan. Milovanovic was then picked up by 2024 Allsvenskan newcomers GAIS. In May 2024, he was one of the instrumental players in the Gothenburg derby where GAIS beat Häcken. Though GAIS rotated their players throughout the season, Göteborgs-Posten pointed out that their avergage point score was higher when Milanovic was played. His performances in 2024 spurred rumours about him joining one of the major Swedish clubs, such as AIK.

== Personal life ==
Being of Serbian descent, Milovanovic was considered by Serbia U21.
