= GAIS–IFK Göteborg rivalry =

Football rivalry in Sweden

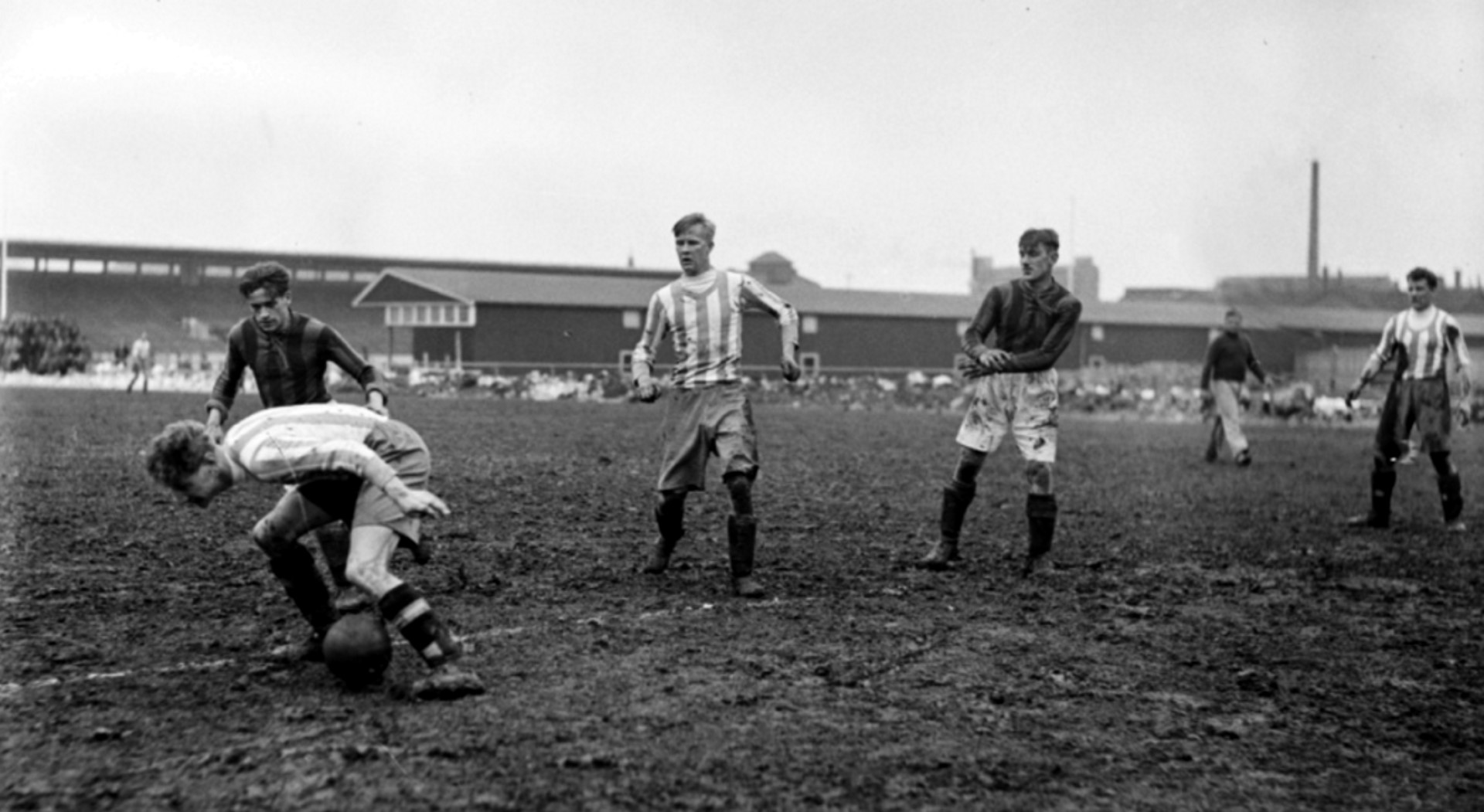
- GAIS and IFK Göteborg in a friendly match in 1937
- Location: Gothenburg
- Teams: GAIS; IFK Göteborg
- First meeting: 10 September 1905; Göteborgsserien, klass 1 IFK Göteborg 11–0 GAIS
- Latest meeting: 26 April 2026; Allsvenskan; IFK Göteborg 2-2 GAIS

Statistics
- Total meetings: Competitive: 132
- Most wins: Competitive: IFK Göteborg (62)
- Largest victory: 10 September 1905; Göteborgsserien, klass 1 IFK Göteborg 11–0 GAIS

The fixture between football clubs GAIS and IFK Göteborg is a local derby in Gothenburg, Sweden and a fierce rivalry. The derby is sometimes called Göteborgsklassikern (transl. The Gothenburg Classic) or Arbetarderbyt (transl. The Worker's Derby). It is also commonly known by the collective term Göteborgsderby (transl. Gothenburg derby) which is also used for other fixtures between Gothenburg clubs. GAIS started playing football in 1897 and IFK Göteborg was founded in 1904, meeting each other for the very first time in 1905. GAIS had its glory period from the late 1910s to the early 1930s, while IFK have been the dominant team for the rest of the derby's existence, winning 18 Swedish championships as well as two UEFA Cup titles. The record attendance for second tier football in Sweden, and all club football outside Allsvenskan, was set at a derby in 1976.

== Rivalry culture ==
The rivalry between GAIS and IFK Göteborg is the biggest in Gothenburg. The latest incident between the two teams occurred in February 2019. Around 13 seconds into the second half, supporters of IFK Göteborg made a pyroshow containing fireworks who injured the GAIS goalkeeper, Marko Johansson.

== Honours ==
As of 27 February 2023

Honour	GAIS	IFK Göteborg
Swedish Championship	4	18
Allsvenskan	4	13
Allsvenskan play-offs	0	5
Mästerskapsserien	0	1
Svenska Serien	2	5
Fyrkantserien	0	2
Svenska Cupen	1	8
Svenska Supercupen	0	1
Svenska Mästerskapet	2	3
UEFA Cup	0	2

== Matches ==
As of 2 September 2025

Competition	Matches	Wins		Draws
Competition	Matches	GAIS	IFK Göteborg	Draws
Allsvenskan	103	30	46	27
Svenska Serien	9	1	6	2
Division 2	6	1	3	2
Göteborgsserien, klass 1	2	0	2	0
Svenska Cupen	5	3	1	1
Svenska Mästerskapet	6	2	4	0
Total	129	37	61	31

=== League ===
==== GAIS at home ====
Date	Venue	Attendance	Score	Competition
15 October 1905 (Note: Also reported as 22 October 1905.)	Balders Hage (Note: Also reported as Idrottsplatsen.)	–	1–10	Göteborgsserien, klass 1
19 May 1916	Walhalla IP	2,000	0–2	Svenska Serien
2 June 1920	Gamla Ullevi	5,700	1–5	Svenska Serien
25 August 1922	Gamla Ullevi	–	0–0 (Note: The referee blew the final whistle 8 minutes before full time due to darkness, the match result was subsequently annulled by the Swedish Football Association and the match was replayed on 2 May 1923.)	Svenska Serien
2 May 1923	Gamla Ullevi	3,000	0–2	Svenska Serien
9 September 1923	Gamla Ullevi	4,000	4–0	Svenska Serien
5 June 1925	Gamla Ullevi	8,768	3–4	Allsvenskan
21 August 1925	Gamla Ullevi	6,661	1–0	Allsvenskan
20 August 1926	Gamla Ullevi	9,020	1–1	Allsvenskan
11 May 1928	Gamla Ullevi	6,006	1–2	Allsvenskan
3 May 1929	Gamla Ullevi	10,510	0–0	Allsvenskan
9 August 1929	Gamla Ullevi	5,514	1–1	Allsvenskan
8 May 1931	Slottsskogsvallen	10,147	0–2	Allsvenskan
27 May 1932	Gamla Ullevi	7,216	2–0	Allsvenskan
19 August 1932	Gamla Ullevi	7,701	2–2	Allsvenskan
4 August 1933	Gamla Ullevi	8,205	0–1	Allsvenskan
10 August 1934	Gamla Ullevi	11,454	2–5	Allsvenskan
2 August 1935	Gamla Ullevi	8,356	0–5	Allsvenskan
21 May 1937	Gamla Ullevi	7,211	2–1	Allsvenskan
11 August 1937 (Note: Also reported as 12 August 1937.)	Gamla Ullevi	5,080	1–4	Allsvenskan
12 August 1938	Gamla Ullevi	6,245	1–1	Division 2
15 August 1941	Gamla Ullevi	9,260	0–3	Allsvenskan
21 May 1943	Gamla Ullevi	11,885	0–1	Allsvenskan
13 August 1943	Gamla Ullevi	9,468	2–5	Allsvenskan
18 August 1944	Gamla Ullevi	9,754	0–2	Allsvenskan
8 August 1945	Gamla Ullevi	10,963	1–3	Allsvenskan
23 May 1947	Gamla Ullevi	10,028	0–0	Allsvenskan
15 August 1947	Gamla Ullevi	19,504	2–0	Allsvenskan
20 May 1949	Gamla Ullevi	19,529	0–0	Allsvenskan
12 August 1949	Gamla Ullevi	17,829	0–0	Allsvenskan
10 August 1951	Gamla Ullevi	21,188 (Note: Also reported as 21,128.)	2–2	Allsvenskan
22 August 1952	Gamla Ullevi	25,326	2–4	Allsvenskan
14 May 1954	Gamla Ullevi	30,615	1–1	Allsvenskan
20 August 1954	Gamla Ullevi	21,462	1–0	Allsvenskan
15 August 1956	Gamla Ullevi	26,322	1–2	Allsvenskan
9 May 1958	Gamla Ullevi	30,934 (Note: Also reported as 32,039.)	1–2	Allsvenskan
14 May 1959	Ullevi	32,485	0–5	Allsvenskan
17 June 1964	Ullevi	10,456	0–1	Allsvenskan
13 October 1966	Ullevi	13,365 (Note: Also reported as 14,446.)	1–5	Allsvenskan
21 September 1967	Ullevi	18,500 (Note: Also reported as 19,848.)	1–4	Allsvenskan
30 May 1968	Ullevi	17,104 (Note: Also reported as 17,194.)	3–0	Allsvenskan
2 September 1969	Ullevi	39,370	1–1	Allsvenskan
13 May 1970	Ullevi	16,934	4–1	Allsvenskan
10 June 1971	Ullevi	27,672	3–1	Division 2
20 May 1976	Ullevi	50,690	1–3	Division 2
18 May 1988	Ullevi	18,286	0–1	Allsvenskan
30 August 1989	Ullevi	13,465	2–1	Allsvenskan
17 May 1990	Ullevi	14,144	0–1	Allsvenskan
16 May 1991	Ullevi	9,083	1–0	Allsvenskan
2 July 1992	Gamla Ullevi	6,538	3–0	Allsvenskan
22 May 2000	Ullevi	31,225	1–1	Allsvenskan
2 May 2006	Ullevi	26,793	1–2	Allsvenskan
25 September 2007	Ullevi	30,956	0–1	Allsvenskan
17 April 2008	Ullevi	27,238	0–0	Allsvenskan
21 May 2009	Gamla Ullevi	13,442	0–1	Allsvenskan
10 May 2010	Gamla Ullevi	15,305	0–0	Allsvenskan
17 October 2011	Gamla Ullevi	15,530	1–0	Allsvenskan
21 May 2012	Gamla Ullevi	16,921	1–1	Allsvenskan
6 May 2024	Gamla Ullevi	16,646	2–1	Allsvenskan
11 August 2025	Gamla Ullevi	18, 078	0–1	Allsvenskan

==== IFK Göteborg at home ====
Date	Venue	Attendance	Score	Competition
10 September 1905	Idrottsplatsen	–	11–0	Göteborgsserien, klass 1
26 September 1915	Walhalla IP	1,508	2–1	Svenska Serien
26 May 1921	Gamla Ullevi	7,206	1–0	Svenska Serien
10 May 1922	Gamla Ullevi	3,489	1–1	Svenska Serien
16 May 1924	Gamla Ullevi	–	3–1	Svenska Serien
8 August 1924	Gamla Ullevi	3,600	1–3	Allsvenskan
30 April 1926	Slottsskogsvallen	6,161	1–1	Allsvenskan
3 June 1927	Gamla Ullevi	10,221	3–4	Allsvenskan
17 August 1927	Slottsskogsvallen	5,394	1–2	Allsvenskan
24 August 1928	Gamla Ullevi	8,363	3–2	Allsvenskan
2 May 1930	Gamla Ullevi	16,990	4–0	Allsvenskan
20 August 1930 (Note: Also reported as 21 August 1930.)	Gamla Ullevi	5,664	0–5	Allsvenskan
7 August 1931	Slottsskogsvallen	6,250	1–2	Allsvenskan
5 May 1933	Gamla Ullevi	13,267	3–1	Allsvenskan
27 April 1934	Gamla Ullevi	11,542	1–2	Allsvenskan
10 May 1935	Gamla Ullevi	14,272	4–0	Allsvenskan
29 May 1936	Gamla Ullevi	2,943	3–0	Allsvenskan
6 September 1936	Gamla Ullevi	8,750	0–3	Allsvenskan
13 May 1938	Gamla Ullevi	6,971 (Note: Also reported as 6,957.)	0–0	Allsvenskan
5 May 1939	Gamla Ullevi	16,239	0–0	Division 2
22 May 1942	Gamla Ullevi	13,701	1–3	Allsvenskan
14 August 1942	Gamla Ullevi	9,389	2–2	Allsvenskan
26 May 1944	Gamla Ullevi	6,827	6–1	Allsvenskan
18 May 1945	Gamla Ullevi	6,157	0–1	Allsvenskan
17 May 1946	Gamla Ullevi	17,018	1–3	Allsvenskan
16 August 1946	Gamla Ullevi	13,301	2–2	Allsvenskan
14 May 1948	Gamla Ullevi	20,313	2–2	Allsvenskan
22 August 1948	Gamla Ullevi	16,034	1–2	Allsvenskan
26 May 1950	Gamla Ullevi	28,320	1–2	Allsvenskan
16 May 1952	Gamla Ullevi	27,506	0–0	Allsvenskan
22 May 1953	Gamla Ullevi	25,922	2–1	Allsvenskan
21 August 1953	Gamla Ullevi	21,565	1–2	Allsvenskan
27 May 1955	Gamla Ullevi	31,897 (Note: Also reported as 31,987.)	1–1	Allsvenskan
24 May 1957	Gamla Ullevi	19,595 (Note: Also reported as 20,680.)	2–4	Allsvenskan
21 August 1957	Gamla Ullevi	25,865 (Note: Also reported as 27,175.)	4–2	Allsvenskan
15 August 1958	Ullevi	23,103 (Note: Also reported as 24,234.)	2–1	Allsvenskan
18 September 1959	Ullevi	13,610	3–2	Allsvenskan
27 August 1964	Ullevi	19,607	1–2	Allsvenskan
12 June 1966	Ullevi	19,019 (Note: Also reported as 20,136.)	1–0	Allsvenskan
11 May 1967	Ullevi	21,941	1–2	Allsvenskan
20 October 1968	Ullevi	19,395	0–0	Allsvenskan
4 June 1969	Ullevi	43,130	2–0	Allsvenskan
9 September 1970	Ullevi	12,095	4–1	Allsvenskan
12 August 1971	Ullevi	10,505	2–1	Division 2
19 August 1976	Ullevi	32,883	3–0	Division 2
22 October 1988	Ullevi	12,310	2–0	Allsvenskan
11 May 1989	Ullevi	12,180	2–2	Allsvenskan
27 August 1990	Ullevi	16,547	0–0	Allsvenskan
30 May 1991	Ullevi	14,110	1–2	Allsvenskan
14 May 1992	Gamla Ullevi	12,602	2–1	Allsvenskan
19 September 2000	Ullevi	22,011	3–2	Allsvenskan
25 September 2006	Ullevi	20,118	0–0	Allsvenskan
28 May 2007	Ullevi	30,406	1–0	Allsvenskan
1 September 2008	Ullevi	29,801	0–1	Allsvenskan
5 October 2009	Gamla Ullevi	17,947	2–1	Allsvenskan
13 September 2010	Gamla Ullevi	17,112	2–1	Allsvenskan
9 May 2011	Gamla Ullevi	17,888	2–1	Allsvenskan
24 September 2012	Gamla Ullevi	13,268 (Note: Also reported as 13,628.)	0–0	Allsvenskan
30 September 2024	Gamla Ullevi	18,051	2–0	Allsvenskan
28 April 2025	Gamla Ullevi	18,021	1–1	Allsvenskan

=== Cup ===
Date	Venue	Attendance	Matches			Competition
Date	Venue	Attendance	Team 1	Score	Team 2	Competition
10 July 1946	Gamla Ullevi	4,891	GAIS	2–2 (3–2 aet)	IFK Göteborg	Svenska Cupen (round 2)
27 August 1986	Ullevi	6,040	GAIS	3–1	IFK Göteborg	Svenska Cupen (round 6)
27 August 1998	Ullevi	3,769	GAIS	1–3	IFK Göteborg	Svenska Cupen (round 4)
25 February 2019	Bravida Arena	6,500	IFK Göteborg	0–3 (awarded)	GAIS	Svenska Cupen (group stage)
26 February 2023	Bravida Arena	5,375	GAIS	2–1	IFK Göteborg	Svenska Cupen (group stage)

=== Other competitions ===
Date	Venue	Attendance	Matches			Competition
Date	Venue	Attendance	Team 1	Score	Team 2	Competition
8 August 1915	Walhalla IP	1,200	GAIS	3–2	IFK Göteborg	Svenska Mästerskapet (round 1)
11 August 1916	Walhalla IP	1,700	IFK Göteborg	4–0	GAIS	Svenska Mästerskapet (round 1)
12 August 1917	Gamla Ullevi	3,106	IFK Göteborg	2–0	GAIS	Svenska Mästerskapet (round 1)
21 August 1918	Walhalla IP	2,300	GAIS	3–5	IFK Göteborg	Svenska Mästerskapet (round 1)
13 August 1919	Gamla Ullevi	–	IFK Göteborg	0–3	GAIS	Svenska Mästerskapet (round 1)
19 September 1920	Walhalla IP	–	IFK Göteborg	2–1	GAIS	Svenska Mästerskapet (round 1)
12 August 1923	–	–	IFK Göteborg	w/o (Note: Both IFK Göteborg and GAIS withdrew from the tournament.)	GAIS	Svenska Mästerskapet (round 1)

== Records ==
As of 18 September 2017

=== Biggest wins ===
Margin	Match			Date	Competition
Margin	Team 1	Score	Team 2	Date	Competition
11	IFK Göteborg	11–0	GAIS	10 September 1905	Göteborgsserien, klass 1
9	GAIS	1–10	IFK Göteborg	15 October 1905	Göteborgsserien, klass 1
5	IFK Göteborg	0–5	GAIS	20 August 1930	Allsvenskan
5	GAIS	0–5	IFK Göteborg	2 August 1935	Allsvenskan
5	IFK Göteborg	6–1	GAIS	26 May 1944	Allsvenskan
5	GAIS	0–5	IFK Göteborg	14 May 1959	Allsvenskan
4	IFK Göteborg	4–0	GAIS	11 August 1916	Svenska Mästerskapet (round 1)
4	GAIS	1–5	IFK Göteborg	2 June 1920	Svenska Serien
4	GAIS	4–0	IFK Göteborg	9 September 1923	Svenska Serien
4	IFK Göteborg	4–0	GAIS	2 May 1930	Allsvenskan
4	IFK Göteborg	4–0	GAIS	10 May 1935	Allsvenskan
4	GAIS	1–5	IFK Göteborg	13 October 1966	Allsvenskan

=== Highest scoring matches ===
Goals	Match			Date	Competition
Goals	Team 1	Score	Team 2	Date	Competition
11	IFK Göteborg	11–0	GAIS	10 September 1905	Göteborgsserien, klass 1
11	GAIS	1–10	IFK Göteborg	15 October 1905	Göteborgsserien, klass 1
8	GAIS	3–5	IFK Göteborg	21 August 1918	Svenska Mästerskapet (round 1)
7	GAIS	3–4	IFK Göteborg	5 June 1925	Allsvenskan
7	IFK Göteborg	3–4	GAIS	3 June 1927	Allsvenskan
7	GAIS	2–5	IFK Göteborg	10 August 1934	Allsvenskan
7	GAIS	2–5	IFK Göteborg	13 August 1943	Allsvenskan
7	IFK Göteborg	6–1	GAIS	26 May 1944	Allsvenskan
6	GAIS	1–5	IFK Göteborg	2 June 1920	Svenska Serien
6	GAIS	2–4	IFK Göteborg	22 August 1952	Allsvenskan
6	IFK Göteborg	2–4	GAIS	24 May 1957	Allsvenskan
6	IFK Göteborg	4–2	GAIS	21 August 1957	Allsvenskan
6	GAIS	1–5	IFK Göteborg	13 October 1966	Allsvenskan

=== Longest win streak ===
Streak	Date		Team
Streak	First match	Last match	Team
6	21 August 1957	17 June 1964	IFK Göteborg
5	26 September 1915	21 August 1918	IFK Göteborg
4	10 August 1934	29 May 1936	IFK Göteborg
4	21 May 1943	18 August 1944	IFK Göteborg
3	2 June 1920	26 May 1921	IFK Göteborg
3	12 August 1971	19 August 1976	IFK Göteborg
3	26 February 2019	6 May 2024	GAIS

=== Longest unbeaten streak ===
Streak	Date		Team
Streak	First match	Last match	Team
12	17 May 1946	16 May 1952	GAIS
8	1 April 1998	17 April 2008	IFK Göteborg
6	2 June 1920	2 May 1923	IFK Göteborg (Note: The streak includes a match annulled by the Swedish Football Association.)
6	21 August 1957	17 June 1964	IFK Göteborg
6	17 October 2011	6 May 2024	GAIS
5	26 September 1915	21 August 1918	IFK Göteborg
5	21 August 1925	17 August 1927	GAIS
5	11 May 1928	2 May 1930	IFK Göteborg
5	11 August 1937	15 August 1941	IFK Göteborg
5	14 August 1942	18 August 1944	IFK Göteborg
5	21 May 2009	9 May 2011	IFK Göteborg

=== Highest attendances ===
Attendance	Date	Venue	Home team	Competition
50,690 (Note: Attendance record for Division 2 and club football in Sweden outside Allsvenskan.)	20 May 1976	Ullevi	GAIS	Division 2
43,130	4 June 1969	Ullevi	IFK Göteborg	Allsvenskan
39,370	2 September 1969	Ullevi	GAIS	Allsvenskan
32,883	19 August 1976	Ullevi	IFK Göteborg	Division 2
32,485	14 May 1959	Ullevi	GAIS	Allsvenskan
31,897	27 May 1955	Gamla Ullevi	IFK Göteborg	Allsvenskan
31,225	22 May 2000	Ullevi	GAIS	Allsvenskan
30,956	25 September 2007	Ullevi	GAIS	Allsvenskan
30,934	9 May 1958	Gamla Ullevi	GAIS	Allsvenskan
30,615	14 May 1954	Gamla Ullevi	GAIS	Allsvenskan

== Shared player and manager history ==
=== Played for both ===
- Glenn Hysén
- Jonas Lundén
- Pär Ericsson
- Anton Kurochkin
- Karl Bohm
- Junes Barny
- Bengt Andersson

=== Played for both, managed both ===
- Gunnar Gren
- Roland Nilsson
