= Kalle Karlsson =

Swedish football manager (born 1981)

Personal information
- Full name: Kalle Shantha Karlsson
- Date of birth: 23 November 1981 (age 44)
- Place of birth: Sri Lanka

Team information
- Current team: Hammarby IF (manager)

Managerial career
- Years: Team
- 2014–2016: Karlbergs BK
- 2017: Vasalunds IF
- 2017: Vasalunds IF (assistant)
- 2018–2019: Karlbergs BK
- 2019–2021: Västerås SK (assistant)
- 2021–2025: Västerås SK
- 2026: Hammarby IF

Kalle Shantha Karlsson (born 23 November 1981) is a Swedish football manager.

== Early life ==
Karlsson was born on 23 November 1981 in Sri Lanka. One year later, he was adopted by a Swedish family.

== Journalism career ==
Karlsson has worked as a sports journalist. American newspaper The New York Times wrote in 2024 that he "was a reporter for Expressen and then for the country’s biggest paper, Aftonbladet. He mainly focused on tactical analysis, and his reputation grew to the extent that he became a television pundit too".

== Managerial career ==
In 2014, Karlsson was appointed manager of Karlbergs BK. Following his stint there, he was appointed manager of Vasalunds IF in 2017 before being appointed as an assistant manager of the club the same year. Subsequently, he returned to Karlbergs BK in 2018. Ahead of the 2020 season, he was appointed as an assistant manager of Västerås SK. Two years later, he was appointed manager of the club and helped them achieve promotion from the second tier to the top flight.
