= Karlbergs BK =

Swedish football club

- Full name: Karlbergs Bollklubb
- Founded: 15 May 1912
- Ground: Kristinebergs IP; Stockholm; Sweden
- Chairman: Mattias Johansson
- Head coach: Douglas Jakobsen
- League: Ettan Norra
- 2025: Ettan Norra, 9th of 16
Home colours	Away colours

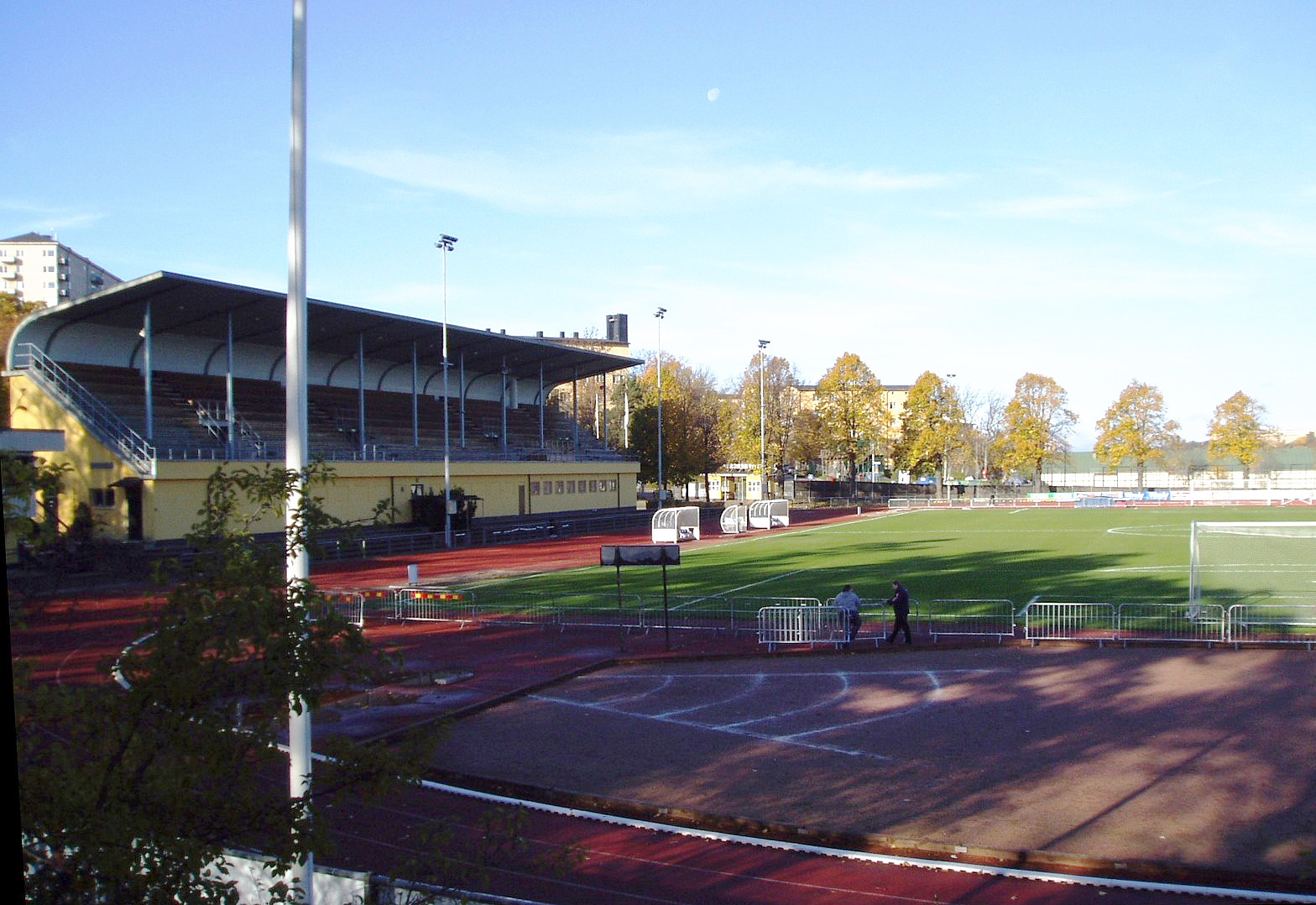
Kristinebergs IP

Karlbergs BK is a professional Swedish football club originating from Karlberg in Birkastaden, an area in the southwestern part of Vasastan in central Stockholm. As Vasastan has no full sized football pitches, the club relocated to neighbouring Kungsholmen and has the majority of its operations on the island.

== Background ==
Karlbergs Bollklubb were formed on 15 May 1912 at a meeting held in a property at Karlbergsvägen 74 in Vasastan. Almost a century after this historic meeting over a thousand boys and girls from Vasastan, Lindhagen and Kungsholmen districts wear the club's red and white colours. The name of the club was later changed to "Widar" before being registered as Karlbergs Bollklubb in 1919.

Since their foundation Karlbergs BK has participated mainly in the middle and lower divisions of the Swedish football league system. The club currently plays professionally in Ettan Norra which is the third tier of Swedish football. They play their home matches at Stadshagens IP on Kungsholmen in central Stockholm.

Karlbergs BK are affiliated to Stockholms Fotbollförbund.

The club has also been playing bandy and ice hockey. While the ice hockey department is defunct since its merger with Tranebergs IF, the bandy department is formally just dormant since 2003. Since 2017, the club plays floorball.

== Recent history ==
In recent seasons Karlbergs BK have competed in the following divisions:

1999 – Division V, Stockholm Mellersta
2000 – Division IV, Stockholm Mellersta
2001 – Division IV, Stockholm Mellersta
2002 – Division IV, Stockholm Mellersta
2003 – Division IV, Stockholm Mellersta
2005 – Division IV, Stockholm Mellersta
2006 – Division IV, Stockholm Mellersta
2007 – Division IV, Stockholm Mellersta
2008 – Division III, Norra Svealand
2009 – Division III, Norra Svealand
2010 – Division III, Norra Svealand
2011 – Division III, Norra Svealand
2012 – Division II, Norra Svealand
2013 – Division II, Norra Svealand
2014 – Division II, Norra Svealand
2015 – Division III, Östra Svealand
2016 – Division II, Norra Svealand
2017 – Division II, Norra Svealand
2018 – Division II, Norra Svealand
2019 – Division II, Norra Svealand
2020 – Division II, Norra Svealand
2021 – Division II, Norra Svealand
2022 – Division II, Södra Svealand
2023 – Division II, Norra Svealand
2024 – Ettan Norra
2025 – Ettan Norra

In 2015, manager Kalle Karlsson brought Karlberg to promotion qualification playoffs in division III and managed to secure promotion to division II for the following year. During 2016, the first season in division II, Kalle Karlsson once again reached promotion qualification playoffs, but narrowly lost in the final phase of the playoffs. Following the 2016 season, Kalle Karlsson left Karlbergs BK to join Vasalunds IF. After a mediocre 2017 season for Karlberg, Kalle Karlsson returned to the club for the 2018 and 2019 seasons, and led Karlberg to promotion qualification playoffs both years, but failed on both occasions to take the final step to division I. Following the 2019 season, Kalle Karlsson left for an assistant coach role at Superettan club Västerås SK, and 24 year old coaching talent Douglas Jakobsen was selected to manage Karlbergs BK for the 2020 season.

== Attendances ==
In recent seasons Karlbergs BK have had the following average attendances:

Season	Average attendance	Division / Section	Level
2007	Not available	Div 4 Stockholm Mellersta	Tier 6
2008	61	Div 3 Norra Svealand	Tier 5
2009	71	Div 3 Norra Svealand	Tier 5
2010	89	Div 3 Norra Svealand	Tier 5
2011	96	Div 3 Norra Svealand	Tier 5
2012	75	Div 2 Norra Svealand	Tier 4
2013	75	Div 2 Norra Svealand	Tier 4
2014	90	Div 2 Norra Svealand	Tier 4
2015	67	Div 3 Östra Svealand	Tier 5
2016	127	Div 2 Norra Svealand	Tier 4
2017	79	Div 2 Norra Svealand	Tier 4
2018	?	Div 2 Norra Svealand	Tier 4
2019	?	Div 2 Norra Svealand	Tier 4
2020		Div 2 Norra Svealand	Tier 4

* Attendances are provided in the Publikliga sections of the Svenska Fotbollförbundet website.

== Current squad ==
As of 3 September 2026

Note: Flags indicate national team as defined under FIFA eligibility rules; some limited exceptions apply. Players may hold more than one non-FIFA nationality.

No.	Pos.	Nation	Player
1	GK	SWE	Argyrios Gkoulios
2	DF	SWE	Filip Nieminen Eriksen
3	DF	SWE	Viktor Steen
4	DF	SWE	Adam Backman
5	MF	SWE	Ben Basaric
7	FW	SWE	Hugo Fernández
8	MF	SWE	Noah Tesfai Negash
9	FW	SWE	Arthin Jamshidi
10	FW	SWE	Aaron Stoch Rydell (on loan from AIK)
11	FW	SWE	Mattias Mitku
12	DF	SWE	Abiel Sequar
13	DF	SWE	Robin Sundgren

No.	Pos.	Nation	Player
14	MF	SWE	Aladji Fati
15	MF	SWE	Viggo Häll
16	FW	SWE	Milian Jansson (on loan from Djurgården)
17	MF	SWE	Hugo Åslund
18	MF	SWE	Milan Lalic
19	FW	SWE	Adam Jemal
20	FW	SWE	Rinwar Othman
21	DF	SWE	Felix Nilsson
24	MF	SWE	Lukas Sietsema
25	DF	SWE	Felix Högberg
26	DF	SWE	Elias Carlsson
35	GK	SWE	Edrisa Bojang
