= Andreas Brännström =

Swedish football manager (born 1976)

Personal information
- Full name: Karl Thomas Christian Andreas Brännström
- Date of birth: 10 May 1976 (age 50)
- Place of birth: Järfälla, Sweden
- Height: 1.87 m (6 ft 2 in)
- Position: Midfielder

Senior career*
Years	Team	Apps	(Gls)
1998–1999	IK Sirius		
2002	Enköpings SK FK		
2005–2006	IK Sirius		

Managerial career
- 2009–2011: IK Sirius
- 2013: AFC United
- 2014–2015: Dalkurd
- 2017–2018: Dalkurd
- 2018–2020: Jönköpings Södra IF
- 2021: Hajduk Split (assistant)
- 2022: Mjällby AIF
- 2023: AIK
- 2024–2025: Mladá Boleslav
- 2026–: Mjällby AIF
- * Club domestic league appearances and goals

Andreas Brännström (born 10 May 1976) is a Swedish football coach and former footballer who is head coach of Mjällby AIF.

== Playing career ==
Brännström started his playing career with Swedish side IK Sirius in 1998. Four years later, he signed for Swedish side Enköpings SK FK. Three years later, he signed for Swedish side IK Sirius. Early in his playing career, he was regarded as a Sweden prospect but was hampered by injuries.

== Managerial career ==
Brännström obtained a UEFA Pro License and started his managerial career with Swedish side IK Sirius, where he suffered relegation from the second tier to the third tier. In 2013, he was appointed manager of Swedish side AFC United before being appointed manager of Swedish side Dalkurd in 2014, helping the club achieve promotion from the third tier to the second tier.

Two years later, he returned to Swedish side Dalkurd as manager, helping the club achieve promotion from the second tier to the top flight. One year later, he was appointed manager of Swedish side Jönköpings Södra IF, helping the club achieve third place in the league. In 2021, he was appointed assistant manager of Croatian side Hajduk. Subsequently, he was appointed manager of Swedish side Mjällby AIF in 2022. In 2023, he was appointed manager of Swedish side AIK. On 24 August 2024, Brännström was appointed manager of Czech club Mladá Boleslav.

On 8 September 2026, he was appointed manager of Mjällby AIF.
