= Björn Hamberg =

Swedish football coach

- Hamberg in 2026

Personal information
- Date of birth: 5 June 1985 (age 41)
- Place of birth: Östersund, Sweden

Team information
- Current team: IF Elfsborg (head coach)

Managerial career
- Years: Team
- 2006–2009: BK Björnen
- 2010: Frösö IF
- 2011–2018: Östersunds FK (assistant)
- 2018–2019: Swansea City (assistant)
- 2019–2022: Brighton & Hove Albion (assistant)
- 2022–2023: Chelsea (assistant)
- 2024–2025: Feyenoord (assistant)
- 2025–2026: Sweden (assistant)
- 2026–: IF Elfsborg

Björn Hamberg (born 5 June 1985) is a Swedish professional football coach who is head coach of Allsvenskan club IF Elfsborg.

Besides Sweden, he has coached in England, Wales and the Netherlands.
