= Andreas Engelmark =

Swedish football coach

Personal information
- Full name: Gunnar Asher Andreas Engelmark
- Date of birth: 19 January 1984 (age 42)
- Place of birth: Pakistan

Team information
- Current team: IK Sirius

Managerial career
- Years: Team
- Ängby IF
- 2023–2024: IF Brommapojkarna
- 2025–: IK Sirius

Gunnar Asher Andreas Engelmark (born 19 January 1984) is a Pakistani-born Swedish football manager. He is currently the head coach of Allsvenskan club IK Sirius.

== Coaching career ==
Engelmark started out coaching lower division club Ängby IF before taking a job at youth football academy Svenska Fotbollsakademin through which he also got to work with womens football club Tyresö FF. In 2010 he joined IF Brommapojkarna as a youth coach. Seven years later he moved to america where he worked at the Major League Soccer club Columbus Crew youth academy.

When he returned to Sweden in 2019 he became the head of development and coach of the U21 team at Brommapojkarna. Ahead of the 2023 Allsvenskan season it was announced that Engelmark would take over as shared head coach of the first team together with former Sweden men's national football team player Olof Mellberg.

Two years later IK Sirius announced that Engelmark would take over as head coach on a three year deal. During his second season at the club Engelmark was given the Allsvenskan manager of the month award for three consecutive months.

== Personal life ==
Engelmark was born in Pakistan and adopted by Swedish parents when he was seven months old.
