= Gothenburg derbies =

Football rivalries in Gothenburg, Sweden

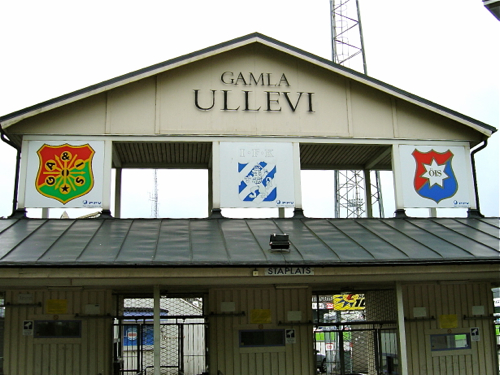
- The crests of GAIS, IFK Göteborg, and Örgryte IS at Gamla Ullevi
- Location: Gothenburg
- Teams: GAIS; Gårda BK; Göteborgs FF; IFK Göteborg; BK Häcken; Redbergslids IK; Västra Frölunda IF; Örgryte IS

A Gothenburg derby (Swedish: Göteborgsderby) is the name given to any fixture between football clubs from Gothenburg, the traditional football capital of Sweden. The major derbies are traditionally played between GAIS, IFK Göteborg, and Örgryte IS, but five other Gothenburg teams have also played in the top tier of Swedish football, giving rise to additional hotly contested derbies.

== Clubs in Gothenburg ==
Allsvenskan clubs in Gothenburg

As of 2026

The following clubs from Gothenburg are either playing in tier 1–3 of the Swedish football league system, or have previously played in the top tier of Swedish football.

Current division	Club(s)	Highest division
Allsvenskan (tier 1)	BK Häcken	Allsvenskan (tier 1)
Allsvenskan (tier 1)	GAIS	Allsvenskan (tier 1)
Allsvenskan (tier 1)	IFK Göteborg	Allsvenskan (tier 1)
Allsvenskan (tier 1)	Örgryte IS	Allsvenskan (tier 1)
Ettan (tier 3)	Utsiktens BK	Superettan (tier 2)
Lower divisions (tier 4–)	Gårda BK	Allsvenskan (tier 1)
Lower divisions (tier 4–)	Göteborgs FF	Svenska Serien (tier 1)
Lower divisions (tier 4–)	Västra Frölunda IF	Allsvenskan (tier 1)
Defunct	Redbergslids IK	Allsvenskan (tier 1)

== Gothenburg derbies ==
=== Major Gothenburg derbies ===
Matches between any two of the three Göteborgsalliansen clubs are major Gothenburg derbies, with matches involving IFK Göteborg being the most popular. No other rivals in Swedish football have met more times than IFK Göteborg and Örgryte IS, and the record attendance for club football in Sweden—52,194–was set on 3 June 1959 in an Allsvenskan match between those two clubs. The record attendance for second tier Swedish football was set on 20 May 1976, when a crowd of 50,690 saw GAIS and IFK Göteborg play in Division 2.

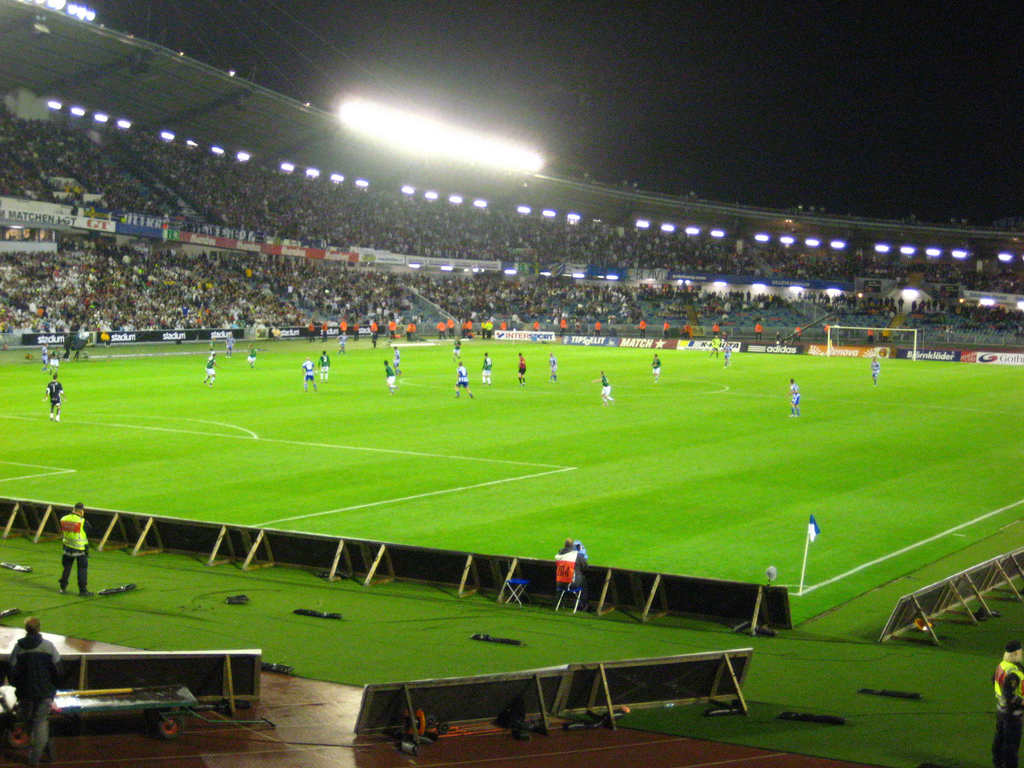
IFK vs GAIS on Ullevi, 1 September 2008.

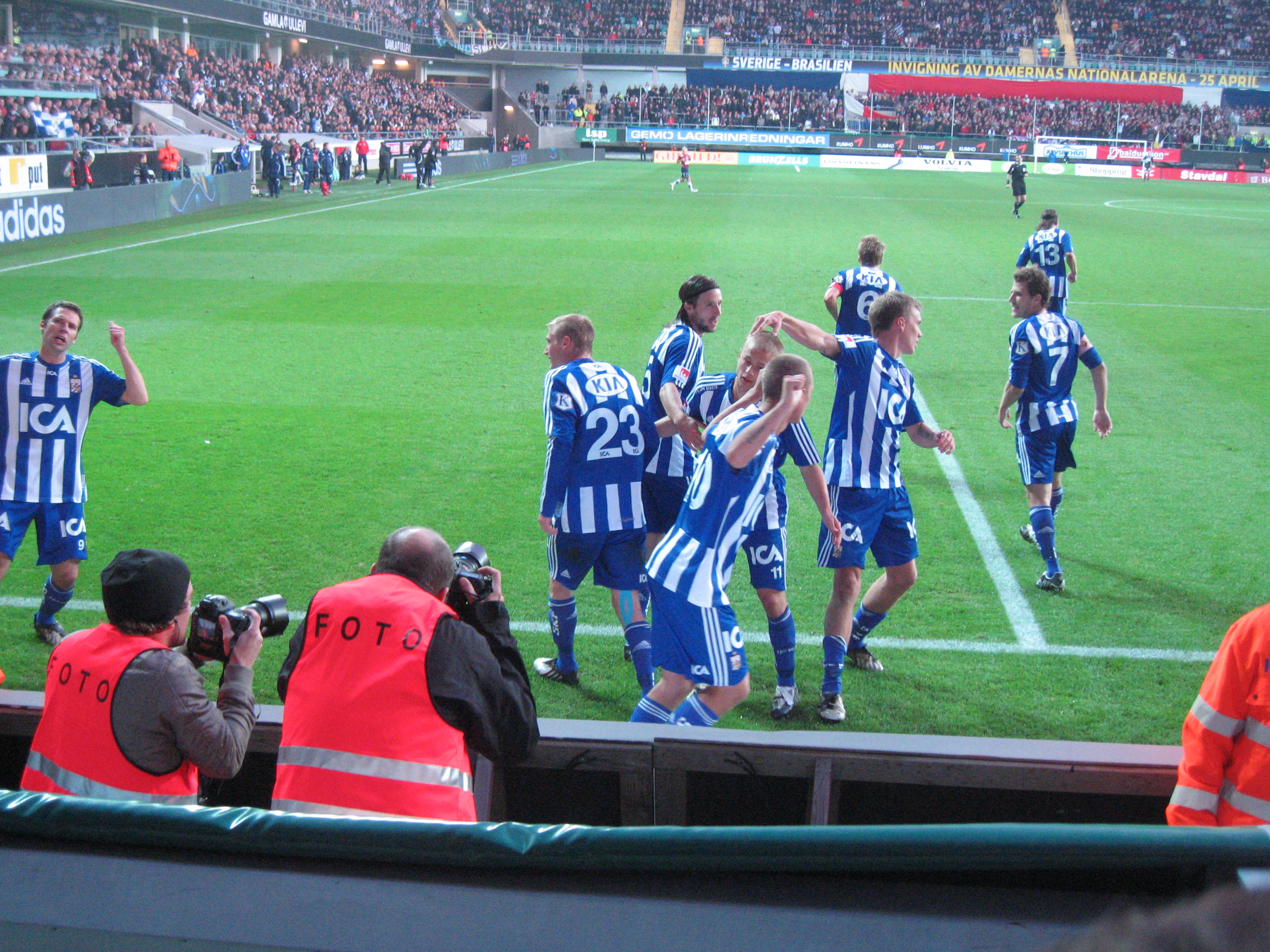
IFK players celebrate a goal against Örgryte on Gamla Ullevi, 20 April 2009.

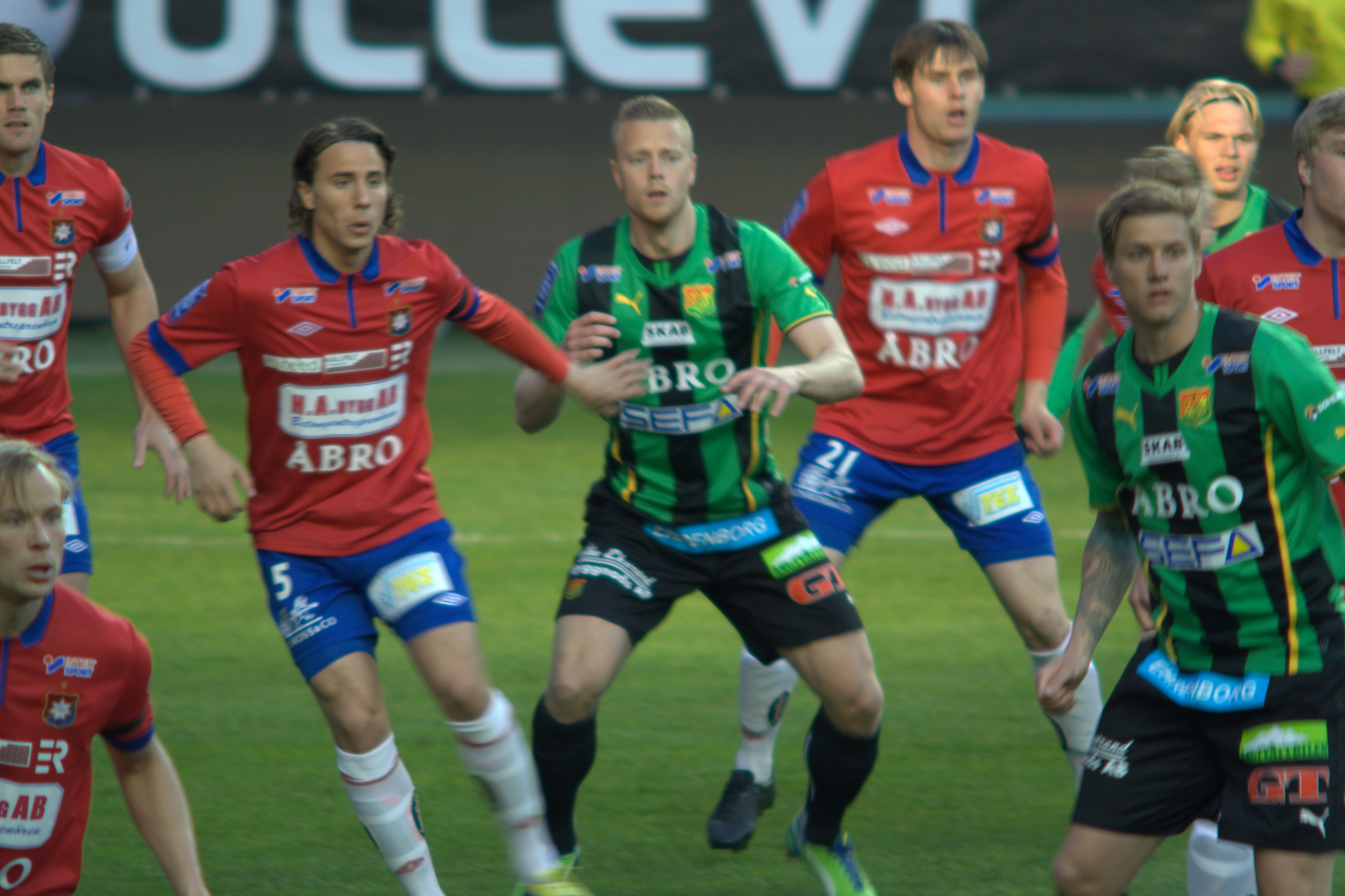
Derby in Superettan between Örgryte and GAIS, 11 May 2013.

=== Minor Gothenburg derbies ===
A further five Gothenburg clubs have played top tier football, and matches between any one of these clubs and the established big three have occasionally developed into minor rivalries. Matches against IFK Göteborg have generally attracted the largest crowds, with GAIS and Örgryte IS as the second and third most attractive matches, respectively.

Göteborgs FF tried to challenge Örgryte IS as the best club from Gothenburg in the early years of the 20th century, and Redbergslids IK made a one-year appearance in Allsvenskan in the 1930s, attracting the third largest average attendance during that season. Gårda BK played eight straight seasons in Allsvenskan in the late 1930s and early 1940s, finishing as the best Gothenburg team two times. Västra Frölunda IF repeated Gårda's feat in 1998, and played 10 seasons in the top tier during the 1980s and 1990s. BK Häcken also made their first appearance in Allsvenskan in the 1980s, but have managed to retain their status as a regular top tier club in part thanks to a stable financial situation.

== See also ==
- Göteborgs Fotbollförbund
