= Andreas Holmberg (footballer) =

Swedish association football player (born 1984)

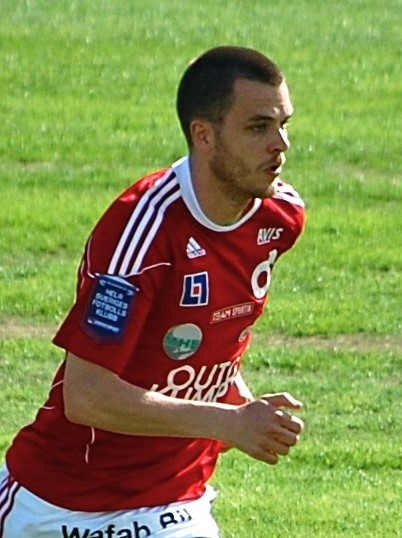
- Holmberg in 2010

Personal information
- Full name: Claes Andreas Holmberg
- Date of birth: 17 August 1984 (age 42)
- Place of birth: Sweden
- Height: 1.83 m (6 ft 0 in)
- Position: Defender

Team information
- Current team: Örgryte (manager)

Senior career*
Years	Team	Apps	(Gls)
–2007	Qviding	28+	(1+)
2007–2017	Degerfors	247	(10)

Managerial career
- 2020–2023: Degerfors
- 2023–: Örgryte
- * Club domestic league appearances and goals

Claes Andreas Holmberg (born 17 August 1984) is a Swedish football manager and a former player who manages Örgryte.

== Career ==
=== Playing career ===
Holmberg started his career with Swedish third tier side Qviding, helping them earn promotion to the Swedish second tier. In 2007, he signed for Degerfors in the Swedish second tier.

=== Managerial career ===
In 2020, Holmberg was appointed manager of Swedish second tier club Degerfors, helping them earn promotion to the Swedish top flight.

On 13 December 2023, Holmerg signed a three-year contract to manage Örgryte, beginning on 1 January 2024.
