= Allsvenskan =

Swedish top division men's association football league

- Founded: 13 January 1924; 102 years ago
- Country: Sweden
- Confederation: UEFA
- Number of clubs: 16
- Level on pyramid: 1
- Relegation to: Superettan
- Domestic cup: Svenska Cupen
- International cup(s): UEFA Champions League; UEFA Europa League; UEFA Conference League
- Current champions: Mjällby AIF (1st title) (2025)
- Most championships: Malmö FF (27 titles)
- Most appearances: Andreas Johansson (445)
- Top scorer: Sven Jonasson (254 goals)
- Broadcaster: TV4
- Website: allsvenskan.se (in Swedish)
- Current: 2026 Allsvenskan

Allsvenskan (Swedish pronunciation: [ˈâlːˌsvɛnːskan]; lit. 'the All-Swedish'), also known as Fotbollsallsvenskan ([ˈfûːtbɔlsˌalːsvɛnskan], lit. 'the All-Swedish Football') is a professional association football league in Sweden and the highest level of the Swedish football league system.

Founded in 1924, it operates on a system of promotion and relegation with Superettan, the second highest league in the Swedish men's football league system. Seasons run from late March or early April to the beginning of November, with the 16 clubs all meeting each other twice, resulting in a 30-match season, for a total of 240 matches league-wide.

Allsvenskan is ranked 19th in the UEFA coefficients of leagues based on performances in European competitions over the last five years. The three teams with most Swedish championships are Malmö FF (24), IFK Göteborg (18) and IFK Norrköping (13). The current champions are Mjällby AIF, who won the title in the 2025 season.

Including the 2025 season, Allsvenskan has been running for an unbroken streak of 101 seasons. Unlike other European football leagues, the Allsvenskan did not experience an interruption in play during World War II due to Swedish neutrality.

== History ==
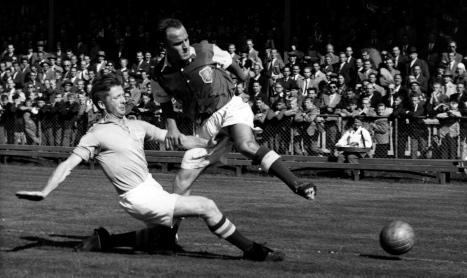
Sune Sandbring, Malmö FF in a game with Frank Jacobsson, GAIS in 1953.

In the 1910s, national league play had been tried in Sweden with Svenska Serien, however it turned out that financing a national league was difficult. Svenska Serien evolved into two series, consisting of a southern and northern group.

On 13 January 1924, football clubs met in Stockholm to found a nationwide series and on 3 August later in the year the opening game was played of the 1924–25 Allsvenskan. The first winner of the one-league twelve team Allsvenskan was GAIS. In 1931, the league started to decide the Swedish football champions.

In the early years, Norrland and Gotland teams were not allowed to play at higher levels in the league system, which was gradually changed to include the Norrland and Gotland teams on higher levels.

For the 1959 Allsvenskan, the season start was changed from autumn to spring to be played in one calendar year. In 1973, the league was expanded to contain 14 teams. In the 1970s, Malmö FF, under the lead of Spanish Antonio Durán and later English Bob Houghton, won five Allsvenskan and managed to proceed to the 1979 European Cup final, which they lost to Nottingham Forest.

From the 1982 season, the league introduced a play-off to determine the Swedish football champions. In the late 1980s, Malmö FF were dominant, winning the league five times in a row, but only two Swedish championships. The 1990 season saw the introduction of three points per win. The play-off season years were followed by two years of continuation league, named Mästerskapsserien.

The 1993 season saw a return to the classical format, again with 14 teams. IFK Göteborg won six Allsvenskan league titles in the 1990s.

In the early 2000s, Djurgårdens IF won three titles (2002, 2003 and 2005). In 2004, Örebro SK lost its place in the league due to financial problems, and Assyriska FF got their place. Since 2008, the league consists of 16 teams.

For the 2017 season, a league match ball was introduced and Select Sport was chosen as supplier for four years.

The 2024 season marked 100 years of existence for Allsvenskan and was celebrated with retro kits during two match days in August. Malmö FF won the centennial Allsvenskan and took their ninth title in the last 15 seasons.

== Status ==
Logo used from 2008 until 2018.

The champions are considered Swedish champions and gold medal winners. The runners-up are awarded the large silver medal, the third positioned team are awarded the small silver medal and the team positioned in fourth place are awarded the bronze medal.

There have been seasons with exceptions when the winners of Allsvenskan wasn't considered Swedish champions as well. Allsvenskan winners between 1924 and 1930 were crowned league champions and awarded gold medals, the title of Swedish champions was awarded to the winner of Svenska Mästerskapet up until 1925 and then not at all until 1930. The years 1982 through 1990 are also exceptions, the title was instead decided through play-offs during these years. The same was true for the years 1991 and 1992 when the title was decided through a continuation league called Mästerskapsserien. Historically, however, there is a big difference between the Allsvenskan winners before 1931 compared to the period between 1982 and 1992. As winning Allsvenskan in its earlier seasons was the optimal aim for the clubs, while as during the era of play-offs and Mästerskapsserien, the optimal goal wasn't to win Allsvenskan, but the play-offs or Mästerskapsserien.

== Competition format ==
Since 2008 there are 16 clubs in Allsvenskan. During the course of a season (starting in late March and ending in early November) each club plays the others twice (home and away) for a total of 30 games. The two lowest placed teams at the end of the season are relegated to Superettan and the top two teams from Superettan are promoted in their place. The third lowest team in Allsvenskan plays a relegation/promotion play-off against the third placed team in Superettan.

The winners of Allsvenskan qualify for the UEFA Champions League, the runner-up together with the third placed team in the table qualify for the UEFA Conference League. The Svenska Cupen winner qualifies for the UEFA Europa League. In case the winner of the cup has already qualified to Champions League or Conference League, the second Conference League spot is given to the team that finishes fourth in Allsvenskan.

=== Changes in competition format ===
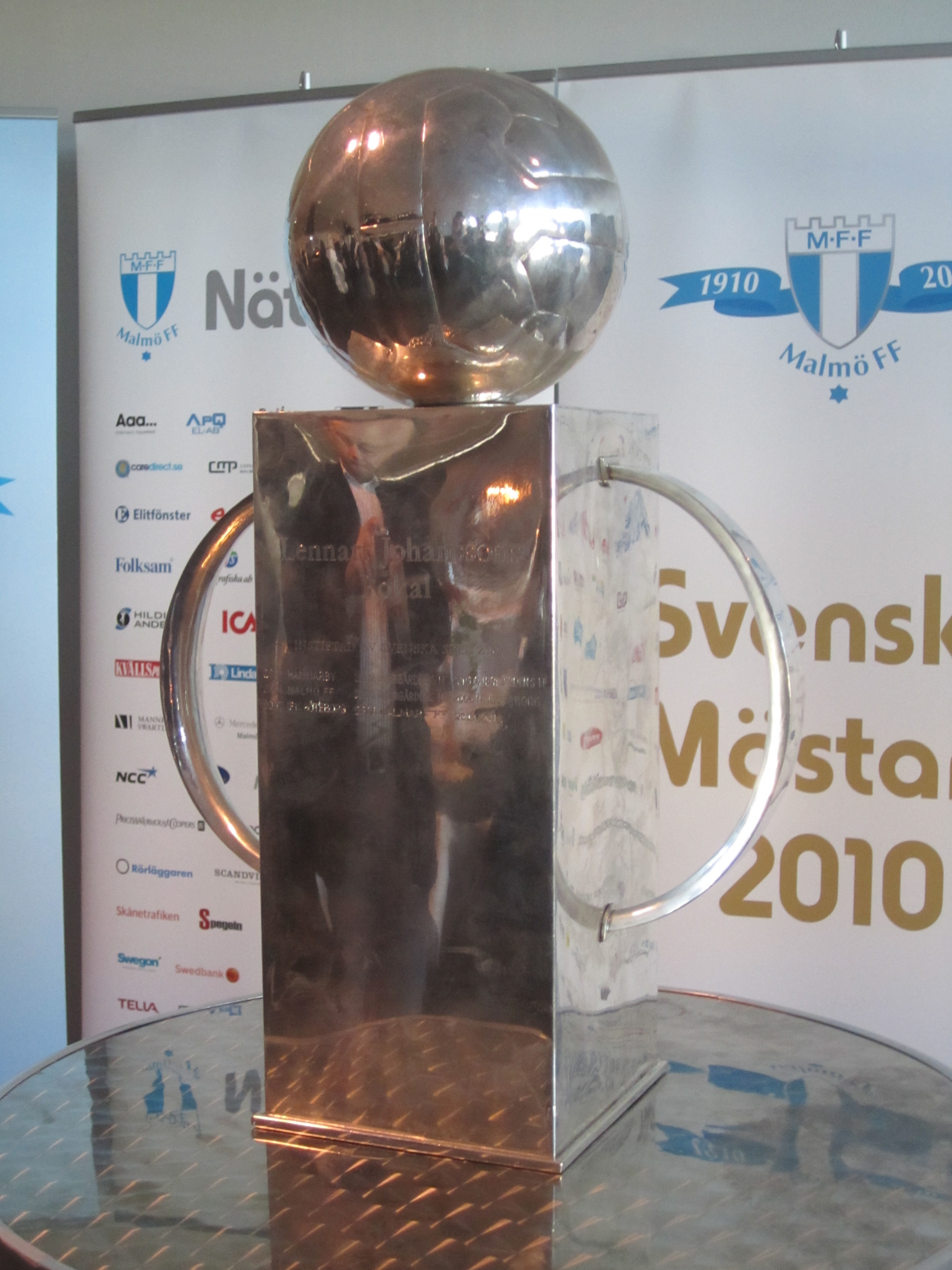
Lennart Johanssons Pokal

| From | To | Teams | Match-weeks | Season start | Season end | Play-offs |
|---|---|---|---|---|---|---|
| 1924–25 | 1956–57 | 12 | 22 | Autumn | Spring | — |
| 1957–58 | | 12 | 33 | Autumn | Next autumn | — |
| 1959 | 1972 | 12 | 22 | Spring | Autumn | — |
| 1973 | 1981 | 14 | 26 | Spring | Autumn | — |
| 1982 | 1983 | 12 | 22 | Spring | Autumn | Play-offs with eight teams |
| 1984 | 1990 | 12 | 22 | Spring | Autumn | Play-offs with four teams |
| 1991 | 1992 | 10 | 18 | Spring | Summer | League with six teams |
| 1993 | 2007 | 14 | 26 | Spring | Autumn | — |
| 2008 | Present | 16 | 30 | Spring | Autumn | — |

The decider at equal number of points was goal ratio until the 1940–41 season, thereafter goal difference.

== Awards ==
=== Trophy ===
The current trophy awarded to the Swedish champions is the Lennart Johanssons Pokal. Created in 2001, the trophy is named after former UEFA chairman, Lennart Johansson. A different trophy that was named after Clarence von Rosen, the first chairman of the Swedish Football Association, had previously been used between 1903 and 2000, but was replaced after journalists reported that von Rosen had personal connections to the later infamous Nazi leader Hermann Göring during the time he lived in Sweden (soon after World War One). The former president of the Swedish Football Association, Lars-Åke Lagrell stated that the reason for the change of trophy was not a personal attack against von Rosen but rather that the Football Association did not want to be linked to Nazism and constantly engage in discussions regarding this every time the trophy was awarded.

=== Player and manager awards ===
In addition to the winner's trophy and the individual winner's medals awarded to players, Allsvenskan also awards the most valuable player, goalkeeper of the year, defender of the year, midfielder of the year, forward of the year, newcomer of the year and manager of year at Allsvenskans stora pris together with C More and Magasinet Offside. Also, the Allsvenskan top scorer is awarded.

== Television ==
=== Sweden ===
The Swiss corporation Kentaro has owned the TV rights for Allsvenskan since 2006. Through licence agreements with the media company TV4 Group matches were aired through C More Entertainment who broadcast them on their C More Sport and C More Live channels, until 2019. Matches also could be bought through the online pay-per-view service C SPORTS.

On 24 March 2017, Discovery-owned channel Eurosport and OTT streaming service Dplay (now known as HBO Max) were chosen to be the new domestic broadcaster for both SEF competitions (Allsvenskan and Superettan) effectively from 2020 until 2025, as well as selected European countries (exc. Italy) for Allsvenskan. In 2024, TV rights for Allsvenskan and Superettan were acquired by TV4 Group from 2026 until 2031.

=== International ===
Beginning in 2018, Allsvenskan matches were previously broadcast in the UK on Premier Sports and FreeSports. In October 2018, ESPN picked up the rights to broadcast one Allsvenskan match per week in the United States. Allsvenskan matches have also been broadcast in several countries, such as DAZN in Austria, Germany, and Switzerland, Sport Klub in Balkan countries, Nova Sports in Cyprus and Greece, TV2 in Norway and 4th Sports in Iraq

=== Current broadcast rights ===
| Region | Broadcaster |
|---|---|
| Sweden | TV4 and TV4 Play |
| Bosnia and Herzegovina | Sport Klub |
| Croatia | Sport Klub |
| Montenegro | Sport Klub |
| North Macedonia | Sport Klub |
| Serbia | Sport Klub |
| Slovenia | Sport Klub |
| Finland | Eurosport |
| France | Eurosport |
| Greece | Eurosport |
| Romania | Eurosport |
| Spain | |
| Hong Kong | TVB |
| Iceland | NENT |
| Iraq | 4th Sports |
| Italy | Sportitalia |
| United Kingdom | LiveScore |

== Clubs ==
Location of teams in the 2026 Allsvenskan
Allsvenskan clubs in Gothenburg

A total of 67 clubs have played in Allsvenskan from its inception in 1924 up to and including the 2026 season. No club has been a member of the league for every season since its inception. AIK is the club that has participated in the most seasons, with a record of 98 out of 102 seasons in total. Malmö FF has the record for most consecutive seasons: 63 between 1936–37 and 1999. IFK Göteborg is currently the club with the longest running streak, starting their 50th season in 2026.

The following 16 clubs are competing in Allsvenskan during the 2026 season:

| Club | Position in 2025 | First season | Number of seasons | First season of current spell | Allsvenskan titles | Last title |
|---|---|---|---|---|---|---|
| AIK | 7th | 1924–25 | 98 | 2006 | 6 | 2018 |
| BK Häcken | 10th | 1983 | 26 | 2009 | 1 | 2022 |
| Degerfors IF | 13th | 1938–39 | 34 | 2025 | 0 | —N/a |
| Djurgårdens IF | 5th | 1927–28 | 71 | 2001 | 8 | 2019 |
| GAIS | 3rd | 1924–25 | 57 | 2024 | 4 | 1953–54 |
| Halmstads BK | 11th | 1933–34 | 59 | 2023 | 4 | 2000 |
| Hammarby IF | 2nd | 1924–25 | 58 | 2015 | 1 | 2001 |
| IF Brommapojkarna | 12th | 2007 | 10 | 2023 | 0 | —N/a |
| IF Elfsborg | 8th | 1926–27 | 83 | 1997 | 6 | 2012 |
| IFK Göteborg | 4th | 1924–25 | 94 | 1977 | 13 | 2007 |
| IK Sirius | 9th | 1969 | 13 | 2017 | 0 | —N/a |
| Kalmar FF | 2nd in Superettan | 1949–50 | 38 | 2026 | 1 | 2008 |
| Malmö FF | 6th | 1931–32 | 91 | 2001 | 27 | 2024 |
| Mjällby AIF | 1st | 1980 | 15 | 2020 | 1 | 2025 |
| Västerås SK | 1st in Superettan | 1955–56 | 6 | 2026 | 0 | —N/a |
| Örgryte IS | 3rd in Superettan | 1924–25 | 57 | 2026 | 2 | 1927–28 |

== Stadiums and locations ==
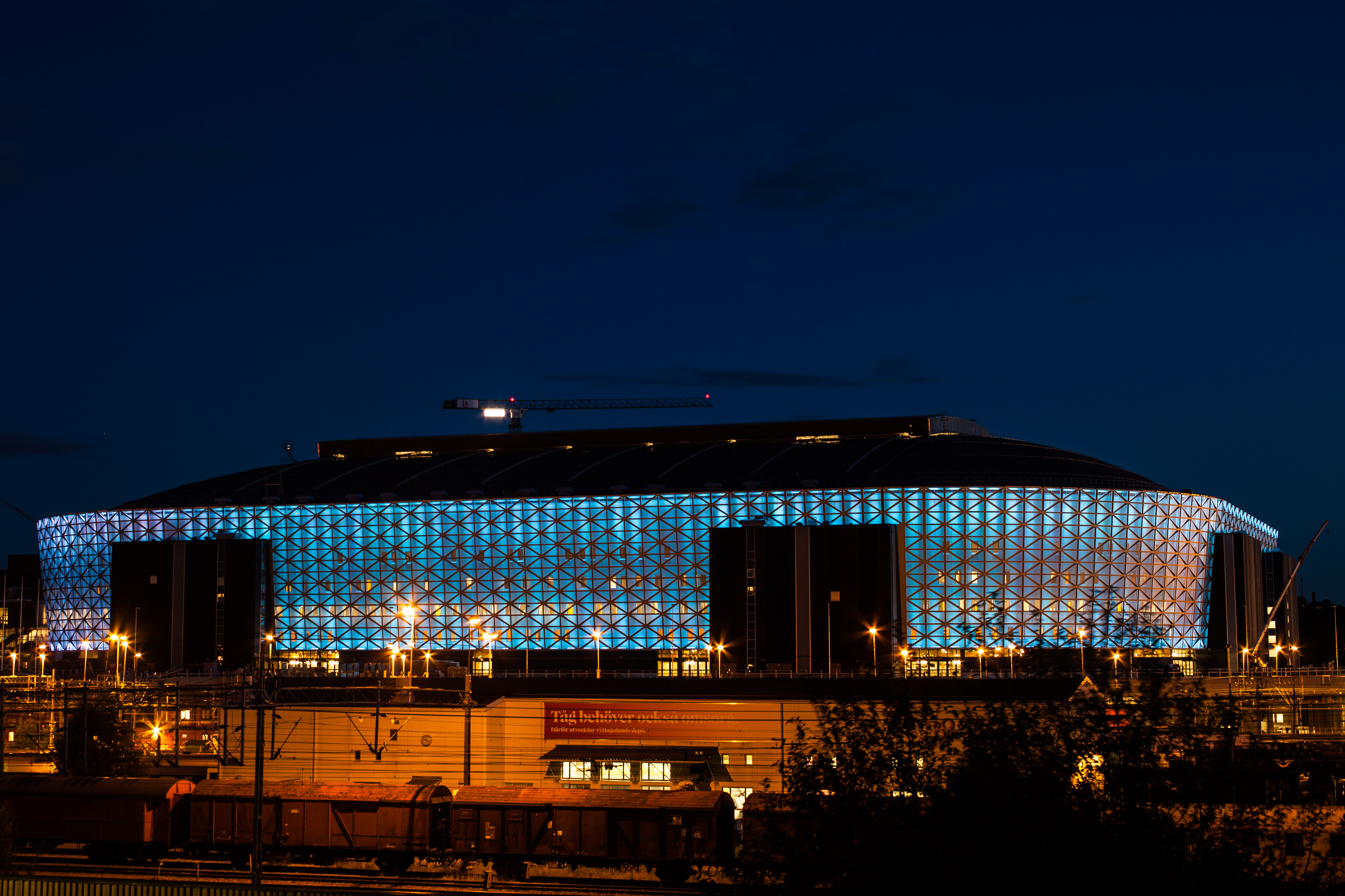
Strawberry Arena in Solna.

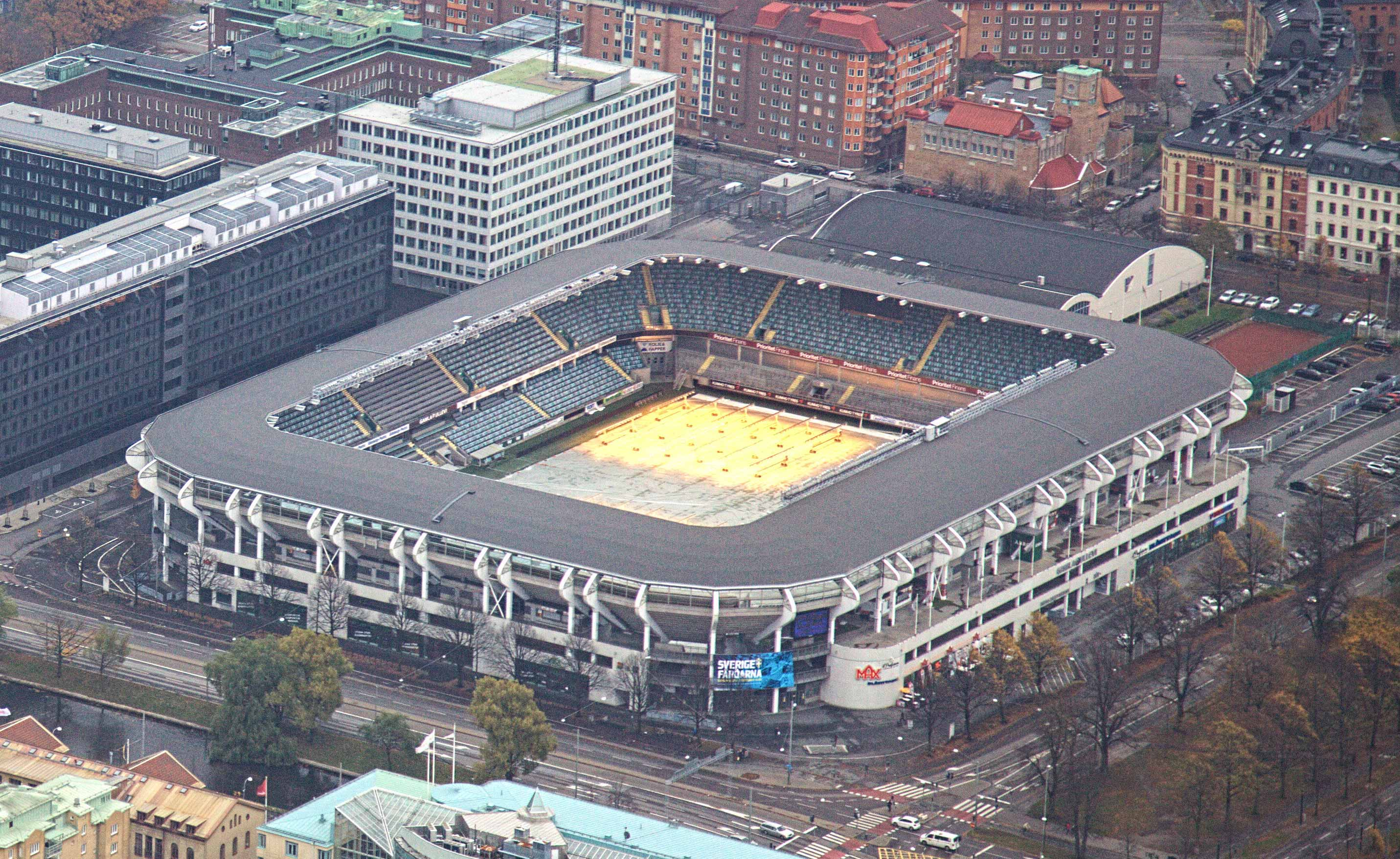
Gamla Ullevi in Gothenburg.

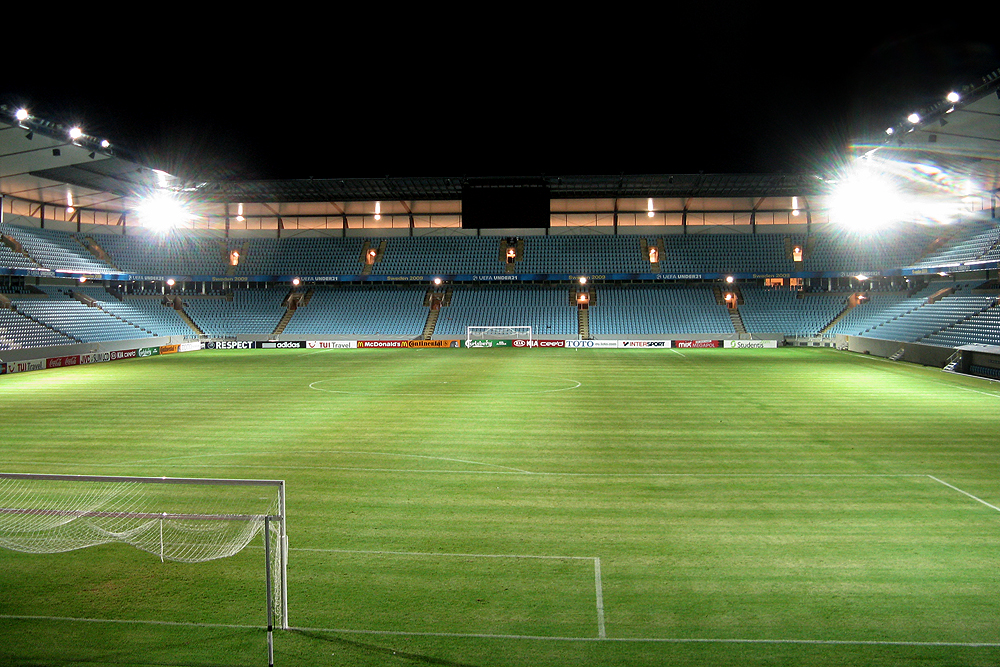
Stadion in Malmö.

| Team | Location | Stadium | Turf | Stadium capacity |
|---|---|---|---|---|
| AIK | Solna | Nationalarenan | Natural | 50,000 |
| BK Häcken | Gothenburg | Nordic Wellness Arena | Artificial | 6,316 |
| Djurgårdens IF | Stockholm | 3Arena | Artificial | 30,000 |
| Degerfors IF | Degerfors | Stora Valla | Natural | 5,880 |
| GAIS | Gothenburg | Gamla Ullevi | Natural | 18,454 |
| Halmstads BK | Halmstad | Örjans Vall | Natural | 10,873 |
| Hammarby IF | Stockholm | 3Arena | Artificial | 30,000 |
| IF Brommapojkarna | Stockholm | Grimsta IP | Artificial | 5,000 |
| IF Elfsborg | Borås | Borås Arena | Artificial | 16,200 |
| IFK Göteborg | Gothenburg | Gamla Ullevi | Natural | 18,454 |
| IK Sirius | Uppsala | Studenternas IP | Artificial | 10,522 |
| Kalmar FF | Kalmar | Guldfågeln Arena | Natural | 12,182 |
| Malmö FF | Malmö | Stadion | Natural | 22,500 |
| Mjällby AIF | Hällevik | Strandvallen | Natural | 7,500 |
| Västerås SK | Västerås | Hitachi Energy Arena | Artificial | 7,044 |
| Örgryte IS | Gothenburg | Gamla Ullevi | Natural | 18,454 |

== Managers ==
To be allowed to manage an Allsvenskan club, the manager must have a UEFA Pro license. From 2012 to 2021, clubs in Allsvenskan changed managers during the season 35 times during the ten seasons.

Nanne Bergstrand is the manager with the most seasons in Allsvenskan, with 21 for four clubs of which ten in a row was with Kalmar FF, while Roy Hodgson is the most successful counting league wins, with seven, and Lajos Czeizler and Roger Gustafsson, counting national titles, with five.

The current managers in Allsvenskan are:

| | Name | Club | Appointed |
|---|---|---|---|
| (Spain) | José Riveiro | AIK | 16 January 2026 |
| (Sweden) | Jens Gustafsson | BK Häcken | 27 December 2024 |
| (Eritrea) | Henok Goitom | Degerfors IF | 9 July 2025 |
| (Finland) | Jani Honkavaara | Djurgårdens IF | 20 December 2024 |
| (Sweden) | Fredrik Holmberg | GAIS | 9 November 2021 |
| (Scotland) | Stuart Baxter | Halmstads BK | 7 May 2026 |
| (Sweden) | Henrik Rydström | Hammarby IF | 5 June 2026 |
| (Sweden) | Ulf Kristiansson | IF Brommapojkarna | 3 December 2024 |
| (Sweden) | Björn Hamberg | IF Elfsborg | 19 February 2026 |
| (Sweden) | Joachim Björklund | IFK Göteborg | 27 July 2026 |
| (Sweden) | Andreas Engelmark | IK Sirius | 3 December 2024 |
| (Finland) | Toni Koskela | Kalmar FF | 20 December 2024 |
| (Norway) | Gaute Helstrup | Malmö FF | 30 June 2026 |
| (Sweden) | Andreas Brännström | Mjällby AIF | 8 September 2026 |
| (Sweden) | Alexander Rubin | Västerås SK | 19 November 2025 |
| (Sweden) | Andreas Holmberg | Örgryte IS | 13 December 2023 |

== Players ==
=== Appearances ===
| Rank | Player | Apps | Goals |
|---|---|---|---|
| 1 | (Sweden) Andreas Johansson | 445 | 20 |
| 2 | (Sweden) Sven Andersson | 431 | 0 |
| 3 | (Sweden) Thomas Ravelli | 416 | 0 |
| 4 | (Sweden) Daniel Tjernström | 411 | 24 |
| 5 | (Sweden) Sven Jonasson | 410 | 254 |

Andreas Johansson has the record for most appearances in Allsvenskan with 445 appearances for Halmstads BK and IFK Norrköping. Johansson overtook the record from Örgryte and Helsingborg goalkeeper Sven Andersson in 2024. Sven Jonasson has the record for most matches in a row with 332 matches for IF Elfsborg between 11 September 1927 and 1 November 1942.

=== Foreign players ===
Until 1974, foreign players were not allowed to play in Allsvenskan, although they were on lower levels of football in Sweden, decided to increase the competitiveness of the national team. In the first season of allowance, on 13 April 1974, English Ronald Powell in Brynäs IF became the first foreign player in Allsvenskan. In 1977, Tunisian Melke Amri became the first non-European player. In 1978, Icelandic Teitur Þórðarson in Östers IF became the first foreign player to win the Allsvenskan

Since 2023, teams may name nine substitutes in their match squad and of the 20 players named in the squad, a maximum of nine may be not homegrown.

=== Top scorers ===
| Rank | Player | Apps | Goals |
|---|---|---|---|
| 1 | (Sweden) Sven Jonasson | 410 | 254 |
| 2 | (Sweden) Carl-Erik Holmberg | 260 | 194 |
| 3 | (Sweden) Filip Johansson | 181 | 180 |
| 4 | (Sweden) Harry Lundahl | 176 | 179 |
| 5 | (Sweden) Harry Bild | 288 | 162 |
| 5 | (Sweden) Bertil Johansson | 267 | 162 |

Sven Jonasson has scored the most goals in Allsvenskan history, with 254 goals in 410 appearances. Gunnar Nordahl, playing for Degerfors IF and IFK Norrköping has become the Allsvenskan top scorer most times, with four wins.

Since 1959, the newspaper Dagens Nyheter awards the first goal scorer of the season opening match day (counted in match minutes) a watch.

== Previous winners ==
Note that this list does not necessarily equate to the Swedish champions, as a play-off format was used in the 1980s. For a comprehensive list of Swedish football champions, see: List of Swedish football champions

Key

| Season when the league didn't decide the Swedish champions |
| Season when Swedish champions wasn't awarded at all |

| Season | Champions | Runners-up |
|---|---|---|
| 1924–25 | GAIS (1) | IFK Göteborg |
| 1925–26 | Örgryte IS (1) | GAIS |
| 1926–27 | GAIS (2) | IFK Göteborg |
| 1927–28 | Örgryte IS (2) | Helsingborgs IF |
| 1928–29 | Helsingborgs IF (1) | Örgryte IS |
| 1929–30 | Helsingborgs IF (2) | IFK Göteborg |
| 1930–31 | GAIS (3) | AIK |
| 1931–32 | AIK (1) | Örgryte IS |
| 1932–33 | Helsingborgs IF (3) | GAIS |
| 1933–34 | Helsingborgs IF (4) | GAIS |
| 1934–35 | IFK Göteborg (1) | AIK |
| 1935–36 | IF Elfsborg (1) | AIK |
| 1936–37 | AIK (2) | IK Sleipner |
| 1937–38 | IK Sleipner (1) | Helsingborgs IF |
| 1938–39 | IF Elfsborg (2) | AIK |
| 1939–40 | IF Elfsborg (3) | IFK Göteborg |
| 1940–41 | Helsingborgs IF (5) | Degerfors IF |
| 1941–42 | IFK Göteborg (2) | GAIS |
| 1942–43 | IFK Norrköping (1) | IF Elfsborg |
| 1943–44 | Malmö FF (1) | IF Elfsborg |
| 1944–45 | IFK Norrköping (2) | IF Elfsborg |
| 1945–46 | IFK Norrköping (3) | Malmö FF |
| 1946–47 | IFK Norrköping (4) | AIK |
| 1947–48 | IFK Norrköping (5) | Malmö FF |
| 1948–49 | Malmö FF (2) | Helsingborgs IF |
| 1949–50 | Malmö FF (3) | Jönköpings Södra IF |
| 1950–51 | Malmö FF (4) | Råå IF |
| 1951–52 | IFK Norrköping (6) | Malmö FF |
| 1952–53 | Malmö FF (5) | IFK Norrköping |
| 1953–54 | GAIS (4) | Helsingborgs IF |
| 1954–55 | Djurgårdens IF (1) | Halmstads BK |
| 1955–56 | IFK Norrköping (7) | Malmö FF |
| 1956–57 | IFK Norrköping (8) | Malmö FF |
| 1957–58 | IFK Göteborg (3) | IFK Norrköping |
| 1959 | Djurgårdens IF (2) | IFK Norrköping |
| 1960 | IFK Norrköping (9) | IFK Malmö |
| 1961 | IF Elfsborg (4) | IFK Norrköping |
| 1962 | IFK Norrköping (10) | Djurgårdens IF |
| 1963 | IFK Norrköping (11) | Degerfors IF |
| 1964 | Djurgårdens IF (3) | Malmö FF |
| 1965 | Malmö FF (6) | IF Elfsborg |
| 1966 | Djurgårdens IF (4) | IFK Norrköping |
| 1967 | Malmö FF (7) | Djurgårdens IF |
| 1968 | Östers IF (1) | Malmö FF |
| 1969 | IFK Göteborg (4) | Malmö FF |
| 1970 | Malmö FF (8) | Åtvidabergs FF |
| 1971 | Malmö FF (9) | Åtvidabergs FF |
| 1972 | Åtvidabergs FF (1) | AIK |
| 1973 | Åtvidabergs FF (2) | Östers IF |
| 1974 | Malmö FF (10) | AIK |
| 1975 | Malmö FF (11) | Östers IF |

| Season | Champions | Runners-up |
|---|---|---|
| 1976 | Halmstads BK (1) | Malmö FF |
| 1977 | Malmö FF (12) | IF Elfsborg |
| 1978 | Östers IF (2) | Malmö FF |
| 1979 | Halmstads BK (2) | IFK Göteborg |
| 1980 | Östers IF (3) | Malmö FF |
| 1981 | Östers IF (4) | IFK Göteborg |
| 1982 | IFK Göteborg (5) | Hammarby IF |
| 1983 | AIK (3) | Malmö FF |
| 1984 | IFK Göteborg (6) | AIK |
| 1985 | Malmö FF (13) | Kalmar FF |
| 1986 | Malmö FF (14) | IFK Göteborg |
| 1987 | Malmö FF (15) | IFK Norrköping |
| 1988 | Malmö FF (16) | IFK Göteborg |
| 1989 | Malmö FF (17) | IFK Norrköping |
| 1990 | IFK Göteborg (7) | IFK Norrköping |
| 1991 | IFK Göteborg (8) | Örebro SK |
| 1992 | IFK Norrköping (12) | Östers IF |
| 1993 | IFK Göteborg (9) | IFK Norrköping |
| 1994 | IFK Göteborg (10) | Örebro SK |
| 1995 | IFK Göteborg (11) | Helsingborgs IF |
| 1996 | IFK Göteborg (12) | Malmö FF |
| 1997 | Halmstads BK (3) | IFK Göteborg |
| 1998 | AIK (4) | Helsingborgs IF |
| 1999 | Helsingborgs IF (6) | AIK |
| 2000 | Halmstads BK (4) | Helsingborgs IF |
| 2001 | Hammarby IF (1) | Djurgårdens IF |
| 2002 | Djurgårdens IF (5) | Malmö FF |
| 2003 | Djurgårdens IF (6) | Hammarby IF |
| 2004 | Malmö FF (18) | Halmstads BK |
| 2005 | Djurgårdens IF (7) | IFK Göteborg |
| 2006 | IF Elfsborg (5) | AIK |
| 2007 | IFK Göteborg (13) | Kalmar FF |
| 2008 | Kalmar FF (1) | IF Elfsborg |
| 2009 | AIK (5) | IFK Göteborg |
| 2010 | Malmö FF (19) | Helsingborgs IF |
| 2011 | Helsingborgs IF (7) | AIK |
| 2012 | IF Elfsborg (6) | BK Häcken |
| 2013 | Malmö FF (20) | AIK |
| 2014 | Malmö FF (21) | IFK Göteborg |
| 2015 | IFK Norrköping (13) | IFK Göteborg |
| 2016 | Malmö FF (22) | AIK |
| 2017 | Malmö FF (23) | AIK |
| 2018 | AIK (6) | IFK Norrköping |
| 2019 | Djurgårdens IF (8) | Malmö FF |
| 2020 | Malmö FF (24) | IF Elfsborg |
| 2021 | Malmö FF (25) | AIK |
| 2022 | BK Häcken (1) | Djurgårdens IF |
| 2023 | Malmö FF (26) | IF Elfsborg |
| 2024 | Malmö FF (27) | Hammarby IF |
| 2025 | Mjällby AIF (1) | Hammarby IF |

== Performances ==
=== Medal table ===
Historically the players and coaching staff from the four best teams in Allsvenskan are awarded medals at the end of each season. The champions are awarded the gold medal while the runners-up receive the large silver medal. The third place team gets the small silver medal instead of the more commonly used bronze medal which is instead awarded to the fourth-place finisher. This tradition of awarding four medals and not three is thought to have to do with the fact that the losers of the semi-finals of Svenska Mästerskapet were both given bronze medals since no bronze match was played.

The overall medal rank is displayed below after points in descending order. 5 points are awarded for a gold medal, 3 points for a large silver medal, 2 points for a small silver medal and 1 point for a bronze medal. The table that follows is accurate as of the end of the 2025 season.

| Rank | Club | Gold | Large silver | Small silver | Bronze | Points |
|---|---|---|---|---|---|---|
| 1 | Malmö FF | 27 | 15 | 10 | 8 | 208 |
| 2 | IFK Göteborg | 13 | 13 | 16 | 11 | 147 |
| 3 | IFK Norrköping | 13 | 10 | 5 | 8 | 113 |
| 4 | AIK | 6 | 15 | 13 | 8 | 109 |
| 5 | Helsingborgs IF | 7 | 8 | 8 | 10 | 85 |
| 6 | Djurgårdens IF | 8 | 4 | 11 | 6 | 80 |
| 7 | IF Elfsborg | 6 | 8 | 6 | 9 | 75 |
| 8 | GAIS | 4 | 4 | 5 | 4 | 46 |
| 9 | Östers IF | 4 | 3 | 3 | 3 | 38 |
| 10 | Örgryte IS | 2 | 2 | 6 | 6 | 34 |
| 11 | Halmstads BK | 4 | 2 | 2 | 2 | 32 |
| 12 | Hammarby IF | 1 | 4 | 4 | 3 | 28 |
| 13 | Kalmar FF | 1 | 2 | 2 | 4 | 19 |
| 14 | Åtvidabergs FF | 2 | 2 | – | 1 | 17 |
| 15 | Örebro SK | – | 2 | 2 | 4 | 14 |
| 16 | BK Häcken | 1 | 1 | 2 | 1 | 13 |
| 17 | Degerfors IF | – | 2 | 2 | 2 | 12 |
| 18 | IK Sleipner | 1 | 1 | 1 | 1 | 11 |
| 19 | Mjällby AIF | 1 | – | – | – | 5 |
| 20 | Landskrona BoIS | – | – | 1 | 3 | 5 |
| 20 | Sandvikens IF | – | – | 1 | 3 | 5 |
| 22 | IFK Malmö | – | 1 | – | – | 3 |
| 22 | Jönköpings Södra IF | – | 1 | – | – | 3 |
| 22 | Råå IF | – | 1 | – | – | 3 |
| 25 | Trelleborgs FF | – | – | 1 | 1 | 3 |
| 26 | IK Brage | – | – | – | 3 | 3 |

=== Honoured clubs ===
Clubs in European football are commonly honoured for winning multiple league titles and a representative golden star is sometimes placed above the club badge to indicate the club having won 10 league titles. In Sweden the star instead symbolizes 10 Swedish championship titles for the majority of the clubs as the league winner has not always been awarded the title of Swedish champions. (Note: The title of "Swedish Champions" has been awarded to the winner of four different competitions over the years. Between 1896 and 1925 the title was awarded to the winner of Svenska Mästerskapet, a stand-alone cup tournament. No club were given the title between 1926 and 1930 even though the first-tier league Allsvenskan was played. In 1931 the title was reinstated and awarded to the winner of Allsvenskan. Between 1982 and 1990 a play-off in cup format was held at the end of the league season to decide the champions. After the play-off format in 1991 and 1992 the title was decided by the winner of Mästerskapsserien, an additional league after the end of Allsvenskan. Since the 1993 season the title has once again been awarded to the winner of Allsvenskan.) Stars for Allsvenskan clubs was not common practise until 2006, although AIK had already introduced a star to their kit in 2000. IFK Göteborg, Malmö FF, IFK Norrköping, Örgryte IS and Djurgårdens IF were the first teams after AIK to introduce their stars. No new club has introduced a star since 2006, the clubs closest to their first are IF Elfsborg with 6 Swedish championship titles and Helsingborgs IF with 7 Allsvenskan titles depending on what the star symbolizes. The following table is ordered after number of stars followed by number of Swedish championship titles and then the number of Allsvenskan titles.

Statistics updated as of the end of the 2024 season

| Club | Swedish championship titles | Allsvenskan titles | Stars | Introduced |
|---|---|---|---|---|
| Malmö FF | 24 | 27 | | 2006 |
| IFK Göteborg | 18 | 13 | | 2006 |
| IFK Norrköping | 13 | 13 | | 2006 |
| AIK | 12 | 6 | | 2000 |
| Djurgårdens IF | 12 | 8 | | 2006 |
| Örgryte IS | 12 | 2 | | 2006 |

=== Cities ===
Locations of the cities that have won the league

| Town or city | League wins | Clubs |
|---|---|---|
| Malmö | 27 | Malmö FF (27) |
| Gothenburg | 20 | IFK Göteborg (13), GAIS (4), Örgryte IS (2), BK Häcken (1) |
| Stockholm | 15 | Djurgårdens IF (8), AIK (6), Hammarby IF (1) |
| Norrköping | 14 | IFK Norrköping (13), IK Sleipner (1) |
| Helsingborg | 7 | Helsingborgs IF (7) |
| Borås | 6 | IF Elfsborg (6) |
| Halmstad | 4 | Halmstads BK (4) |
| Växjö | 4 | Östers IF (4) |
| Åtvidaberg | 2 | Åtvidabergs FF (2) |
| Hällevik | 1 | Mjällby AIF (1) |
| Kalmar | 1 | Kalmar FF (1) |

== Statistics ==
=== All-time table ===
The all-time Allsvenskan table (Swedish: Maratontabellen) is a cumulative record of all match results, points, and goals of every team that has played in Allsvenskan since its inception in 1924–25. It uses three points for a win even though this system was not introduced until the 1990 season. The matches played in the championship play-offs between 1982 and 1990 or the matches played in Mästerskapsserien in 1991 and 1992 are not included. The table that follows is accurate as of the end of the 2025 season.

Malmö FF are the current leaders, having had the lead since the end of the 2012 season when they overtook the lead from IFK Göteborg. IFK Göteborg are the club to have spent most seasons in the top spot with 48 seasons as leaders with a record of the most consecutive seasons as leaders with 35 seasons between 1938 and 1972. Six clubs have been in the lead, the lead having changed among them ten times since 1925. The former leader with the lowest current ranking in the table is GAIS, currently placing 10th and 2134 points short of Malmö FF.

| Pos | Team | Seas | Pld | W | D | L | GF | GA | GD | Pts | LstSeas |
|---|---|---|---|---|---|---|---|---|---|---|---|
| 1 | Malmö FF | 90 | 2219 | 1120 | 560 | 539 | 4009 | 2565 | +1444 | 3920 | 2025 |
| 2 | IFK Göteborg | 93 | 2271 | 1056 | 546 | 669 | 4087 | 3014 | +1073 | 3714 | 2025 |
| 3 | AIK | 97 | 2367 | 1029 | 618 | 720 | 3878 | 3118 | +760 | 3705 | 2025 |
| 4 | IFK Norrköping | 85 | 2077 | 895 | 508 | 674 | 3617 | 2981 | +636 | 3193 | 2025 |
| 5 | IF Elfsborg | 82 | 2026 | 836 | 499 | 691 | 3401 | 3061 | +340 | 3007 | 2025 |
| 6 | Djurgårdens IF | 70 | 1763 | 747 | 428 | 588 | 2803 | 2398 | +405 | 2669 | 2025 |
| 7 | Helsingborgs IF | 69 | 1683 | 726 | 364 | 593 | 3055 | 2617 | +438 | 2542 | 2022 |
| 8 | Hammarby IF | 57 | 1442 | 531 | 347 | 564 | 2181 | 2253 | −72 | 1937 (Note: Hammarby IF were deducted three points in 2006.) | 2025 |
| 9 | Halmstads BK | 58 | 1469 | 501 | 380 | 588 | 1995 | 2237 | −242 | 1883 | 2025 |
| 10 | GAIS | 56 | 1313 | 492 | 310 | 511 | 2050 | 2093 | −43 | 1786 | 2025 |
| 11 | Örgryte IS | 56 | 1306 | 487 | 321 | 498 | 2153 | 2048 | +105 | 1782 | 2009 |
| 12 | Örebro SK | 53 | 1338 | 469 | 343 | 526 | 1815 | 2010 | −195 | 1750 | 2021 |
| 13 | Kalmar FF | 37 | 998 | 357 | 259 | 382 | 1252 | 1380 | −128 | 1330 | 2024 |
| 14 | Östers IF | 34 | 824 | 301 | 239 | 284 | 1195 | 1062 | +133 | 1142 | 2025 |
| 15 | BK Häcken | 25 | 714 | 270 | 188 | 256 | 1116 | 1012 | +104 | 998 | 2025 |
| 16 | Degerfors IF | 33 | 778 | 266 | 181 | 331 | 1151 | 1316 | −165 | 979 | 2025 |
| 17 | Landskrona BoIS | 34 | 800 | 261 | 194 | 345 | 1207 | 1501 | −294 | 977 | 2005 |
| 18 | Åtvidabergs FF | 20 | 512 | 177 | 118 | 217 | 713 | 766 | −53 | 649 | 2015 |
| 19 | Sandvikens IF | 21 | 471 | 165 | 81 | 225 | 775 | 948 | −173 | 576 | 1961 |
| 20 | Mjällby AIF | 14 | 400 | 141 | 102 | 157 | 482 | 524 | −42 | 525 | 2025 |
| 21 | Trelleborgs FF | 18 | 476 | 134 | 121 | 221 | 552 | 766 | −214 | 523 | 2018 |
| 22 | GIF Sundsvall | 20 | 528 | 116 | 147 | 265 | 581 | 915 | −334 | 495 | 2022 |
| 23 | IK Brage | 18 | 408 | 126 | 109 | 173 | 493 | 655 | −162 | 487 | 1993 |
| 24 | IK Sleipner | 16 | 352 | 137 | 61 | 154 | 702 | 738 | −36 | 472 | 1941 |
| 25 | Gefle IF | 16 | 434 | 116 | 119 | 199 | 488 | 710 | −222 | 467 | 2016 |
| 26 | IK Sirius | 12 | 344 | 105 | 80 | 159 | 445 | 584 | −139 | 395 | 2025 |
| 27 | IFK Malmö | 13 | 297 | 90 | 63 | 144 | 428 | 619 | −191 | 333 | 1962 |
| 28 | IFK Eskilstuna | 14 | 317 | 86 | 59 | 172 | 560 | 850 | −290 | 317 | 1964 |
| 29 | Jönköpings Södra IF | 12 | 280 | 81 | 71 | 128 | 392 | 568 | −176 | 314 | 2017 |
| 30 | Västra Frölunda IF | 10 | 240 | 64 | 65 | 111 | 266 | 395 | −129 | 257 | 2000 |
| 31 | IF Brommapojkarna | 9 | 266 | 65 | 55 | 146 | 285 | 477 | −192 | 250 | 2025 |
| 32 | IS Halmia | 11 | 244 | 61 | 48 | 135 | 351 | 539 | −188 | 231 | 1979 |
| 33 | Östersunds FK | 6 | 180 | 56 | 45 | 79 | 221 | 274 | −53 | 213 | 2021 |
| 34 | Gårda BK | 8 | 176 | 53 | 52 | 71 | 233 | 324 | −91 | 211 | 1943 |
| 35 | IFK Sundsvall | 5 | 130 | 36 | 37 | 57 | 161 | 236 | −75 | 145 | 1981 |
| 36 | IFK Värnamo | 4 | 120 | 33 | 30 | 57 | 137 | 190 | −53 | 129 | 2025 |
| 37 | Varbergs BoIS | 4 | 120 | 30 | 30 | 60 | 137 | 206 | −69 | 120 | 2023 |
| 38 | Falkenbergs FF | 5 | 150 | 29 | 30 | 91 | 158 | 305 | −147 | 117 | 2020 |
| 39 | Västerås SK | 5 | 126 | 29 | 22 | 75 | 127 | 260 | −133 | 109 | 2024 |
| 40 | Syrianska FC | 3 | 90 | 20 | 16 | 54 | 88 | 153 | −65 | 76 | 2013 |
| 41 | Råå IF | 2 | 44 | 16 | 8 | 20 | 66 | 85 | −19 | 56 | 1952 |
| 42 | Ljungskile SK (Note: Ljungskile SK were known as Panos Ljungskile SK during the season of 1997.) | 2 | 56 | 11 | 11 | 34 | 54 | 109 | −55 | 44 | 2008 |
| 43 | AFC Eskilstuna | 2 | 60 | 8 | 16 | 36 | 51 | 110 | −59 | 40 | 2019 |
| 44 | Westermalms IF | 2 | 44 | 10 | 7 | 27 | 69 | 120 | −51 | 37 | 1929 |
| 45 | Umeå FC | 1 | 26 | 8 | 6 | 12 | 35 | 45 | −10 | 30 | 1996 |
| 46 | IFK Uddevalla | 2 | 44 | 6 | 12 | 26 | 58 | 114 | −56 | 30 | 1927 |
| 47 | Hallstahammars SK | 2 | 44 | 6 | 12 | 26 | 56 | 114 | −58 | 30 | 1939 |
| 48 | Stattena IF | 2 | 44 | 8 | 4 | 32 | 58 | 155 | −97 | 28 | 1930 |
| 49 | Motala AIF | 1 | 33 | 6 | 7 | 20 | 35 | 68 | −33 | 25 | 1958 |
| 50 | Dalkurd FF | 1 | 30 | 6 | 6 | 18 | 30 | 57 | −27 | 24 | 2018 |
| 51 | Redbergslids IK | 1 | 22 | 5 | 5 | 12 | 35 | 60 | −25 | 20 | 1931 |
| 52 | Ludvika FfI | 1 | 22 | 6 | 2 | 14 | 30 | 56 | −26 | 20 | 1945 |
| 53 | IK Oddevold | 1 | 26 | 5 | 4 | 17 | 20 | 43 | −23 | 19 | 1996 |
| 54 | IFK Luleå | 1 | 22 | 4 | 6 | 12 | 20 | 44 | −24 | 18 | 1971 |
| 55 | IF Saab | 1 | 26 | 4 | 6 | 16 | 26 | 53 | −27 | 18 | 1973 |
| 56 | Reymersholms IK | 1 | 22 | 4 | 4 | 14 | 27 | 57 | −30 | 16 | 1942 |
| 57 | Norrby IF | 1 | 22 | 3 | 6 | 13 | 30 | 52 | −22 | 15 | 1956 |
| 58 | BK Derby | 1 | 26 | 3 | 6 | 17 | 18 | 53 | −35 | 15 | 1977 |
| 59 | Assyriska FF | 1 | 26 | 4 | 2 | 20 | 17 | 52 | −35 | 14 | 2005 |
| 60 | Brynäs IF | 1 | 26 | 2 | 8 | 16 | 27 | 63 | −36 | 14 | 1974 |
| 61 | Enköpings SK | 1 | 26 | 3 | 5 | 18 | 22 | 59 | −37 | 14 | 2003 |
| 62 | Högadals IS | 1 | 22 | 3 | 3 | 16 | 24 | 56 | −32 | 12 | 1962 |
| 63 | Västerås IK | 1 | 22 | 2 | 5 | 15 | 21 | 66 | −45 | 11 | 1925 |
| 64 | IFK Holmsund | 1 | 22 | 3 | 1 | 18 | 24 | 79 | −55 | 10 | 1967 |
| 65 | Sandvikens AIK | 1 | 22 | 2 | 1 | 19 | 24 | 72 | −48 | 7 | 1955 |
| 66 | IK City | 1 | 22 | 1 | 4 | 17 | 32 | 83 | −51 | 7 | 1926 |
| 67 | Billingsfors IK | 1 | 22 | 0 | 3 | 19 | 28 | 84 | −56 | 3 | 1947 |

| Leaders | Years | Seasons | Accumulated seasons in lead |
|---|---|---|---|
| GAIS | 1925–1928 | 4 | 4 |
| Örgryte IS | 1929 | 1 | 1 |
| Helsingborgs IF | 1930 | 1 | 1 |
| GAIS | 1931–1935 | 5 | 9 |
| IFK Göteborg | 1936 | 1 | 1 |
| GAIS | 1937 | 1 | 10 |
| IFK Göteborg | 1938–1972 | 35 | 36 |
| AIK | 1973–1979 | 7 | 7 |
| Malmö FF | 1980–1999 | 20 | 20 |
| IFK Göteborg | 2000–2011 | 12 | 48 |
| Malmö FF | 2012–Present | 14 | 34 |

| 2026 Allsvenskan |
| 2026 Superettan |
| Lower divisions |
| Defunct or merged into other club |

=== UEFA coefficients ===
The following data indicates Swedish coefficient rankings between European football leagues.

View chart definition.

Country ranking

UEFA League Ranking for the 2018–2023 period:

- 21. (22) (Israel) Israeli Premier League (25.000)
- 22. (21) (Cyprus) Cypriot First Division (24.475)
- 23. (23) (Sweden) Allsvenskan (23.750)
- 24. (28) (Poland) Ekstraklasa (20.750)
- 25. (27) (Hungary) Nemzeti Bajnokság I (20.625)

Club ranking

UEFA 5-year Club Ranking as of 19 May 2026:

- 65. ▲ (70) Djurgårdens IF (32.000)
- 98. ▲ (124) Malmö FF (15.000)
- 194. ▼ (157) IF Elfsborg (11.000)
- 273. ▲ (169) BK Häcken (10.000)
- 273. ▲ (247) Hammarby IF (6.000)
- 273. ▲ (253) AIK (5.925)
- 273. ▲ (254) Kalmar FF (5.925)

=== Attendance ===
Last five seasons average attendance
| Year | Spectators per match |
|---|---|
| 2019 | 9,166 |
| 2020 | N/A |
| 2021 | N/A |
| 2022 | 9,958 |
| 2023 | 10,017 |
| 2024 | 10,786 |
| 2025 | 10,982 |

The record for highest average home attendance for a club was set by Hammarby in 2022 (26,372 over 15 home matches). Most other attendance records for Allsvenskan were set in the 1959 season, coinciding with the first season that the league switched from an autumn–spring format to a spring–autumn format. 1959 saw records for highest attendance at a match (52,194 at an Örgryte win over IFK Göteborg at Ullevi), second highest average home attendance for a club (25,490 for Örgryte's 11 home matches), and the highest ever average attendance for Allsvenskan as a whole (13,369).

In the past, AIK had the league's highest attendance for the season more often than any other club, followed by IFK Göteborg and Örgryte. However, for the past decade, Hammarby has dominated the attendance figures helped by a move to the larger Tele2 Arena from the much smaller Söderstadion. Other teams that have for at least one season had the best attendance in the league include Helsingborg, Malmö FF, Djurgården, GAIS, Örebro SK and Öster.

== Referees ==
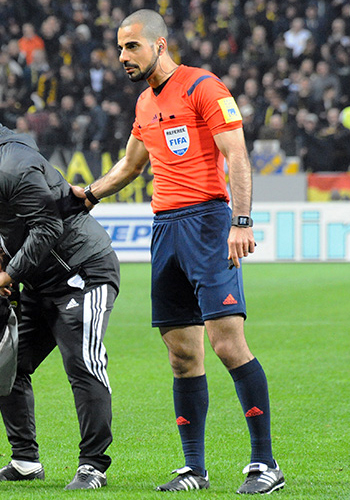
Mohammed Al-Hakim

As of the 2014 season Allsvenskan has 12 referees that are categorized as Allsvenskan referees, seven of which are fully certified international FIFA referees. Apart from these, female FIFA referee Tess Olofsson also occasionally officiates games in Allsvenskan as the only woman to ever having done so. Since 2009, the referees are professional.

=== List ===
Note: FIFA referees are in bold

- **Mohammed Al-Hakim**
- **Andreas Ekberg**
- **Kristoffer Karlsson**
- **Glenn Nyberg**
- **Adam Ladebäck**
- **Joakim Östling**
- **Granit Maqedonci**
- Fredrik Klitte
- Victor Wolf
- Richard Sundell
- Oscar Johnson
- Adi Aganovic

== Allsvenskan in international competition ==
Malmö FF were runners up in the 1978–79 European Cup, after a 1–0 defeat against Nottingham Forest.

IFK Göteborg won the UEFA Cup twice, in 1981–82 (defeating Hamburger SV in the finals) and 1986–87 (defeating Dundee United in the finals). IFK Göteborg also reached the semi-finals of the European Cup in 1985–86. They won 3–0 against FC Barcelona, and lost 0–3 at Camp Nou, Barcelona won on penalty shootout.

In 2024-25, Djurgårdens IF Fotboll reached the semi-finals of the UEFA Conference League.

The following teams have participated in UEFA Champions League, UEFA Europa League or UEFA Conference League group stages:

| Club | UEFA Champions League | UEFA Europa League | UEFA Conference League |
|---|---|---|---|
| IFK Göteborg | 1992–93 (SF); 1994–95 (QF); 1996–97 (GS); 1997–98 (GS) | —N/a | —N/a |
| Malmö FF | 2014–15 (GS); 2015–16 (GS); 2021–22 (GS) | 2011–12 (GS); 2018–19 (R32); 2019–20 (R32); 2022–23 (GS); 2024–25 (GS); 2025–26 (GS) | —N/a |
| Helsingborgs IF | 2000–01 (GS) | 2007–08 (R32); 2012–13 (GS) | —N/a |
| AIK | 1999–2000 (GS) | 2012–13 (GS) | —N/a |
| IF Elfsborg | —N/a | 2007–08 (GS); 2013–14 (GS); 2024–25 (GS) | —N/a |
| BK Häcken | —N/a | 2023–24 (GS) | 2025–26 (GS) |
| Halmstads BK | —N/a | 2005–06 (GS) | —N/a |
| Östersunds FK | —N/a | 2017–18 (R32) | —N/a |
| Djurgårdens IF | —N/a | —N/a | 2022–23 (R16); 2024–25 (SF) |

== See also ==
- Damallsvenskan
- Seasons in Swedish football
- Sports attendances
