= Moustafa Benshi =

Syrian footballer (born 2002)

Personal information
- Date of birth: 7 January 2002 (age 24)
- Place of birth: Aleppo, Syria
- Position: Attacking midfielder

Team information
- Current team: IF Karlstad
- Number: 7

Youth career
- 2016: Kalmar Södra IF
- 2016–2021: Kalmar FF

Senior career*
Years	Team	Apps	(Gls)
2021	Kalmar FF	2	(0)
2022	IFK Berga	24	(9)
2023–	IF Karlstad	31	(7)

International career
2021	Syria U23	1	(0)
- * Club domestic league appearances and goals as of 8 May 2024

Moustafa Benshi (born 7 January 2002) is a Syrian professional footballer who plays as an attacking midfielder for Ettan Fotboll club IF Karlstad.

== Club career ==
Born in Syria, Benshi emigrated to Sweden with his family in 2015. He joined Kalmar Södra IF the following year. After spending few months at the club, he moved to youth academy of Kalmar FF. He made his senior team debut for the club on 18 August 2021 by scoring a goal in 3–1 cup win against Lunds BK.

== International career ==
In August 2021, Benshi was named in Syria under-23 team squad for a training camp which was held in Amman.

== Personal life ==
Born in Syria, Benshi left the country with his family in 2012 due to Syrian civil war. As a child, he worked in a textile factory in Turkey for an year to meet his family's financial requirements.

== Career statistics ==
=== Club ===
As of 29 August 2021

Appearances and goals by club, season and competition
Club	Season	League			Cup		Continental		Total	
Club	Season	Division	Apps	Goals	Apps	Goals	Apps	Goals	Apps	Goals
Kalmar FF	2021	Allsvenskan	2	0	1	1	—		3	1
Career total			2	0	1	1	0	0	3	1
