= Tripple 44 Football Academy =

Football club in Ibadan, Nigeria

- Full name: Tripple 44 Football Academy
- Nickname: Tripple 44 FC
- Founded: 2017
- Founder/Proprietor: Samuel Olatunji Okuku
- Head Coach: Abioye Michael Oluwatosin
- Website: www.tripple44fc.com
| Home colours | Away colours | Third colours |

Tripple 44 Football Academy is a football talent development hub and a youth football club in Ibadan, Nigeria.

== History ==
Tripple 44 Football Academy was founded in 2014 by Club Proprietor Olatunji Okuku, with an initial class of 4 players. The club was officially registered and affiliated with the Nigerian Football Federation through the Oyo State Football Association in 2017 when it began full operations.

Tripple 44 Football Academy went on a 30-match unbeaten run which lasted for 14 months before losing to the Golden Eaglets in June 2022.

== Notable players ==
In 2019, Peter Olawale was selected to represent the Nigeria U-17 football team at the 2019 FIFA U-17 World Cup in Brazil. Olawale was profiled by FIFA before the tournament and was tipped to shine at the 2019 FIFA U-17 World Cup, where he scored in Nigeria's third match against Australia. Olawale signed with Hapoel Ra'nana in 2020 despite also being linked to Borussia Dortmund and Lille OSC.

After his second season in the Israeli Liga Alef North, playing for Hapoel Ra'nana, he moved to the Hungarian league to join Debreceni VSC.

On May 23, 2026, HJK completed the transfer of 19 years old striker, David Olorunfemi from Tripple 44

More notable players include:

- Emmanuel Adeyemo - FC Vizela
- Abel Ogwuche - Trelleborg
- David Habila - Hapoel Ramat Gan
- Ozor Okeke - Nigeria U-17, IF Elfsborg
- Ifeoluwa Olowoporoku - Nigeria U-17
- Usman Ajibola Owoyemi - Nigeria U-17
- Ibrahim Adewale - Mjallby AIF
- Chijioke Julius Linus - Nigeria U-17
- Emmanuel Godwin - FK Pardubice
- Mustapha Adam - Shooting Stars
- Prince Amos - Vasalund IF
- Israel Oladeji - Warri Wolves
- David Olorunfemi - HJK

== Current squad ==
| No | Pos | Player | Nation | Jersey Nmbr |
|---|---|---|---|---|
| 1. | GK | Soetan Damilola | (Nigeria) NGA | 50 |
| 2. | GK | Joshua Oluwaseyi | (Nigeria) NGA | 1 |
| 3. | RWB | Oyetayo Azeez | (Nigeria) NGA | 19 |
| 4. | CB | Onyedikachi Onyebueke | (Nigeria) NGA | 40 |
| 5. | CB | Ogwuche Michael | (Nigeria) NGA | 24 |
| 6. | LWB | Iliya Henry | (Nigeria) NGA | 12 |
| 7. | RWB | Faruq Tiamiyu | (Nigeria) NGA | 2 |
| 8. | CDM | Hamza Hudu | NGA | 39 |
| 9. | CB/DM | Odusanmi Oluwasegun | NGA | 18 |
| 10. | CM | Olowoporoku Joshua | NGA | 14 |
| 11. | CM | Usman Qodri | NGA | 27 |
| 12. | AM | Bitrus Shedrach | NGA | 20 |
| 13. | DM | Owolabi Precious | NGA | 25 |
| 14. | RWF | Abubakar Muhammed | NGA | 17 |
| 15. | CF | Olaitan Oluwabukunmi | NGA | 36 |
| 16. | LWF | Oluwanishola Ishola | NGA | 29 |
| 17. | DM | Aluko Moses | NGA | 34 |
| 18. | AM/WF | Godspower Henry | NGA | 11 |
| 19. | LWF | Agim Covenant | NGA | 7 |
| 20. | LWB | Bamidele Michael | NGA | 3 |
| 21. | CF | Etim Michael | NGA | 13 |
| 22. | RWF/LWF | Ogbonna Success | NGA | 16 |

== Technical and management team ==
| Name | Position |
| Abioye Michael Oluwatosin | Head coach |
|---|---|
| Adegoke Niyi | U15 Coach |
| Kingsley Idowu | Goalkeeper Trainer |

Management
| Name | Position |
|---|---|
| Samuel Olatunji Okuku | Chairman/Proprietor |
