= Adam Bark =

Swedish footballer

Personal information
- Full name: Adam Count Leon Bark
- Date of birth: 15 February 2000 (age 26)
- Place of birth: Sweden
- Height: 1.65 m (5 ft 5 in)
- Position: Forward

Team information
- Current team: IF Karlstad
- Number: 8

Youth career
- Rynninge IK
- Latorp IF
- 2013: Karlslunds IF
- 2014–2015: IK Sturehov
- 2016–2018: Örebro SK

Senior career*
Years	Team	Apps	(Gls)
2015	IK Sturehov	8	(1)
2018–2019	Örebro SK	1	(0)
2020–2022	Motala AIF	82	(30)
2023–2024	Örebro SK	51	(4)
2025	IF Karlstad	29	(9)
2026	Jönköpings Södra IF	13	(1)
2026-	IF Karlstad	16	(3)

International career
2016–2017	Sweden U17	4	(0)
2017	Sweden U19	3	(0)
- * Club domestic league appearances and goals as of 16 November 2026

Adam Count Leon Bark (born 15 February 2000) is a Swedish footballer who plays for IF Karlstad in the Swedish Ettan Norra.

== Club career ==
=== Örebro SK ===
Adam Bark started his career in Rynninge IK. During his youth, he represented several clubs in Örebro. 15-year old Bark joined Örebro SK in November 2016, after a good season with IK Sturehov, where he played for the club's best team in the Swedish fourth division. Bark started on the club's U17 team. In January 2017, Bark played his first game for Örebro's first team, when he scored a goal in a friendly game against IK Sirius.

After having been with the first team squad on three training camps, played several friendly and U21 games, trained regularly with the first team and been on the bench for two Allsvenskan games, the club confirmed on 8 December 2018, that Bark and Helmer Andersson had been promoted to the first team squad for the 2019 season. However, he was still under a youth-contract, which expired at the end of the new season.

On 14 July 2019, he got his Allsvenskan and professional debut in a game against BK Häcken. Bark started on the bench, but replaces Albin Granlund in the 88th minute. However, he left the club at the end of 2019, where his contract expired, as he was not offered his first professional contract.

=== Motala AIF ===
Shortly after the contract with ÖSK expired, Bark signed a two-year contract with newly promoted Division 1 Södra team Motala AIF.

=== Return to Örebro SK ===
In January 2023, Bark returned to his former club Örebro SK.

=== IF Karlstad ===
On 30 December 2024, Bark signed for IF Karlstad.

=== Jönköpings Södra IF ===
On 1 March 2026 Bark signed for Jönköpings Södra IF.
