= Lukas Rhöse =

Swedish footballer

Personal information
- Date of birth: 7 August 2000 (age 26)
- Position: Midfielder Defender

Team information
- Current team: Karlstad

Youth career
- Norrstrands IF
- –2016: Carlstad United BK

Senior career*
Years	Team	Apps	(Gls)
2017–2019	Carlstad United BK	31	(1)
2018	→ FBK Karlstad (loan)	4	(0)
2020–2021	IF Karlstad	29	(3)
2021–2022	Kalmar FF	3	(0)
2023–2024	Skövde AIK	24	(0)
2024–	Karlstad	0	(0)
- * Club domestic league appearances and goals as of 15 March 2024

Lukas Rhöse (born 7 August 2000) is a Swedish football midfielder who plays for Karlstad.
