= Ibrahim Adewale =

Nigerian footballer

Personal information
- Full name: Ibrahim Adekunle Adewale
- Date of birth: 20 September 2006 (age 20)
- Place of birth: Abuja, Nigeria
- Positions: Forward; right winger

Team information
- Current team: Norrby IF (on loan from Mjällby AIF)
- Number: 13

Youth career
- 2018–2024: Tripple 44

Senior career*
Years	Team	Apps	(Gls)
2025	Tripple 44	0	(0)
2025	→ IF Karlstad (loan)	29	(15)
2026–	Mjällby AIF	1	(0)
2026–	→ Norrby IF (loan)	16	(1)
- * Club domestic league appearances and goals as of 12 November 2026

Ibrahim Adekunle Adewale (born 20 September 2006), also known by the nickname Selica, is a Nigerian professional footballer who plays as a forward or right winger for Norrby IF, on loan from Mjällby AIF in Allsvenskan, the top tier of Swedish football.

Previously a youth player at Tripple 44 Football Academy in Nigeria, Adewale moved to IF Karlstad Fotboll on loan in March 2025, competing in Ettan Norra, the third tier of Swedish football. In his debut professional season he recorded 15 goals and 6 assists across 29 appearances before Mjällby AIF, the 2025 Allsvenskan champions, acquired him on a contract through 2030.

== Early life ==
Adewale was born and raised in Abuja, Nigeria's capital city. He grew up with his parents and three sisters. At around the age of 12 he was scouted and brought to Tripple 44 Football Academy in Ibadan, Oyo State, some 500 kilometres from his hometown.

== Club career ==
=== Tripple 44 Football Academy ===
During his youth career, Adewale played for Tripple 44 Football Academy for approximately seven years, from around the age of 11 to 18. The academy, founded in 2014 by Samuel Okuku, is based in Ibadan and focuses on preparing young Nigerian players for professional careers in Europe alongside continued education. It has been officially affiliated with the Nigerian Football Federation through the Oyo State Football Association since 2017, and has developed several players who have moved to European clubs.

In the 2023–24 season Adewale served as captain at Tripple 44 and contributed a combined 20 goals and assists. His form led to trial spells at Malmö FF, IF Elfsborg and IFK Norrköping, none of which resulted in a contract.

==== IF Karlstad Fotboll (loan) ====
In March 2025, Adewale and academy teammate Ajibola Owoyemi were loaned to IF Karlstad Fotboll in Ettan Norra for the remainder of the season, with an option for Karlstad to sign Adewale permanently in the event of promotion to Superettan. In his debut professional league season Adewale recorded 21 goals and assists in total across all competitions, finishing as the player with the highest number of successful dribbles in Ettan Norra that season. He also spent a significant part of the season deployed as a right wingback rather than as an outright forward.

His performances attracted reported interest from clubs in Austria, Finland, Denmark and Norway, but it was the reigning Allsvenskan champions Mjällby AIF who secured his signature. Karlstad head coach Paul Olausson said of the player: "We saw already in his debut match against Örebro SK that he is a special player. Since then he has taken steps the whole time and shown a great work capacity defensively. He has been tactically receptive, so it has been a pleasure to work with him."

=== Mjällby AIF (2026–) ===
On 2 November 2025, Mjällby AIF and Tripple 44 Football Academy agreed terms under which Mjällby purchased Adewale outright. He signed a contract through the 2030 season and joined the club in January 2026. Mjällby's sporting director Hasse Larsson described Adewale as "a great talent with elite qualities in his pace, goal threat and work rate." As the 2025 Allsvenskan champions, Mjällby qualified for the UEFA Champions League qualifying rounds for the 2025–26 season. Following the transfer, Tripple 44 Academy publicly celebrated the move as validation of their development programme.

In July 2026, Adewale was loaned out to Superettan side Norrby IF for the rest of the season.

== Career statistics ==
Season	Club	League	League			Cup			Total		
Season	Club	League	Apps	Goals	Assists	Apps	Goals	Assists	Apps	Goals	Assists
2025	IF Karlstad Fotboll	Ettan Norra	28	15	6	1	1	0	29	15	6
2026–	Mjällby AIF	Allsvenskan	–	–	–	–	–	–	–	–	–

== Honours ==
Mjällby

- Svenska Cupen: 2025–26
