= Goliat field =

Offshore oil field

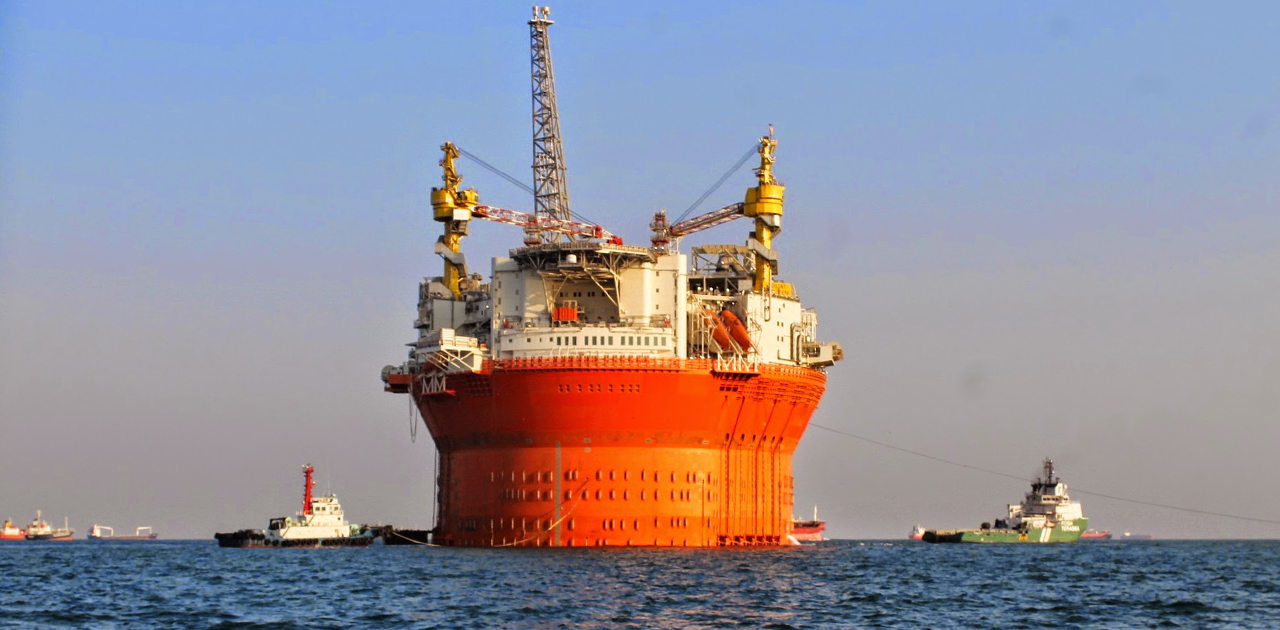
- Goliat FPSO in South Korea, 2015

- Location within Norway
- Country: Norway
- Location: Norwegian Sea
- Block: 229/229B
- Offshore/onshore: offshore
- Coordinates: 71.30°N 22.30°E
- Operator: Vår Energi AS
- Partners: Vår Energi (65%); Equinor (35%)

Field history
- Discovery: 2000
- Start of development: 2009
- Start of production: 2017

Production
- Recoverable oil: 174 million barrels (~2.37×10^{7} t)
- Producing formations: Kobbe; Realgrunnen; Snadd; Klappmyss

Goliat field is an offshore oil field in the Norwegian sector of the Norwegian Sea. It is located 85 kilometres (53 mi) northwest of Hammerfest. The license, awarded in 1997, is owned by Vår Energi AS (operator, 65%) and Equinor ASA (35%). Oil was discovered in 2000. The field development concept was approved by the Government of Norway on 8 May 2009. The field will be developed by using Goliat FPSO, a floating production storage and offloading unit.

Goliat field has two main formations (Kobbe and Realgrunnen) and two minor formations (Snadd and Klappmyss). Recoverable reserves are 174 million barrels (27.7×10^{6} m^{3}). The production, which was expected to start in summer 2015 on Goliat oil platform, could only begin in April 2016. Goliat is the northernmost sea oil platform at the moment. Production is estimated to continue for 10–15 years. The associated gas will be reinjected to increase oil recovery or will be transported to the processing plant at Melkøya. Production takes place through a subsea system consisting of 22 wells, of which 12 are oil producers, 7 water injectors and 3 gas injectors. The platforms operation has been halted temporarily in October 2017 due to some of the electrical equipment not being suitable for hazardous areas.

A new reservoir was uncovered in 2018 in the southern Hammerfest Basin.
