= IF Karlstad Fotboll =

Swedish football club

- Full name: Idrottsföreningen Karlstad Fotboll
- Nicknames: SvartBlå, KF
- Founded: 25 November 2019; 6 years ago (in current form)
- Ground: Sola Arena, Karlstad
- Capacity: 4,000
- Chairman: Patrik Hjelte
- Head coach: Anders Bååth
- League: Ettan Norra
- 2026: Ettan Norra, 5th (2025)
- Website: karlstadfotboll.com
Home colours

IF Karlstad Fotboll (commonly known as KF or SvartBlå) is a Swedish football club based in Karlstad, Värmland County. The club competes in Ettan Norra, the third tier of Swedish football.

The club was formed in its current structure on 25 November 2019, when Karlstad BK — whose football history dates to 1923 — and Carlstad United BK merged to create a unified organisation representing over a century of combined football tradition in Karlstad. The club operates a SEF-certified academy ranked among the top 30 in Sweden, a women's team competing in Division 1 Mellersta with ambitions towards the professional Elitettan, and one of Värmland's most active business partner networks. KF maintains a formal collaboration with Mjällby AIF, the 2025 Allsvenskan champions.

== History ==
=== Background ===
Football under the current organisation traces back to 19 October 1923, when Karlstad BK was founded from the football sections of Karlstads IK and IF Göta. The club operated under several names across the decades — including Karlstads BIK and Karlstads BK — and competed predominantly in the second and third tiers of Swedish football without ever reaching Allsvenskan. The most celebrated chapter of the early era came in 1959–1961, when the club recruited Gunnar Nordahl as player-manager. Nordahl — winner of four Swedish league titles with IFK Norrköping, Olympic gold medallist in 1948 and five-time Italian Capocannoniere as part of the legendary Gre-No-Li trio at AC Milan — led the team to a fourth-place finish in Division 2 in 1961, which remains the best result ever achieved by a Karlstad club in men's football. The second forerunner club, Carlstad United BK, was established in 1998 as a collaboration between several Karlstad clubs and grew to reach Division 1 Norra. In November 2019, when both Karlstad BK and Carlstad United were competing in Ettan Norra, they agreed to merge under the new name IF Karlstad Fotboll, aiming to pool the city's football resources and build towards the professional game.

=== Post-merger development (2020–) ===
The club's opening season in 2020 ended with an eighth-place finish. A fourth-place finish in 2021 — the club's best result to that point — was achieved under coach Konstantinos Panagopoulos. In 2022 the club moved its home matches to Sola Arena in Sandbäcken. Paul Olausson was appointed head coach ahead of the 2025 season. That season, Karlstad Fotboll achieved the first series lead in their entire history in Ettan Norra and finished fifth with 54 points (16W–6D–8L). The club begins 2026 with Superettan promotion as its stated goal.

=== Sven-Göran Eriksson ===
In February 2022, Sven-Göran Eriksson was announced as sporting adviser to IF Karlstad Fotboll. Eriksson, who grew up in nearby Torsby and is widely regarded as Sweden's most decorated football manager, had previously managed clubs including Lazio, Roma, Manchester City, Benfica and IFK Göteborg — with whom he won the UEFA Cup in 1987 — and had served as head coach of the England, Ivory Coast and Mexico national teams. The announcement drew significant international media attention to the club and placed Karlstad Fotboll on the global football map. In December 2022 his role was elevated to sporting director, and a new coaching staff was appointed for the 2023 season. Eriksson's involvement helped attract experienced players and accelerated the club's commercial development, including the growth of its business partner network. However, he fell ill shortly after taking up the sporting director position. In January 2024 he publicly revealed that he had been diagnosed with an aggressive form of cancer. Sven-Göran Eriksson passed away on 26 August 2024, aged 76. His funeral in his home village of Fryksände was attended by, among others, David Beckham. Among those who carried his coffin was David Johannesson, who had played for and worked alongside Eriksson at Karlstad Fotboll. The sports complex in Torsby where the club plays development and reserve matches has since been named Svennis Arena in his memory.

=== Collaboration with Mjällby AIF ===
In the summer of 2025, IF Karlstad Fotboll formalised a collaboration with Mjällby AIF, Sweden's 2025 Allsvenskan champions and 2026 UEFA Champions League preliminary-round participants. The partnership includes player loan arrangements in both directions and creates a structured career pathway between the clubs. During 2025, defender Argjend Miftari joined Karlstad on loan from Mjällby. Later that year, striker Ibrahim Adewale — who had developed at Karlstad — was acquired by Mjällby on a contract through 2030. His career trajectory, from a Nigerian academy to Allsvenskan via Karlstad Fotboll, has been cited as an example of the club's function as a development bridge for international talent.

== Facilities ==
=== Sola Arena ===
Competitive home matches are played at Sola Arena in Sandbäcken, Karlstad, with a capacity of 4,000 spectators.

=== Våxnäs IP — Training complex ===
Day-to-day training, youth development and academy activities are based at Våxnäs IP in the Våxnäs district of Karlstad. The complex provides year-round professional training conditions unusual for a third-tier club in Sweden:

- Two full-size (11v11) natural grass pitches
- Kenneth Wahlström Arena (also known as the Karlstad Airdome) — a full-size 11v11 artificial turf pitch under a permanent inflatable roof, enabling training and matches throughout the year regardless of weather conditions
- Indoor hall with artificial turf for 9v9 play
- Outdoor artificial turf pitch under construction in 2026
- Club gym accessible to players and staff
- Multiple 7v7 and 5v5 pitches for youth and academy use

== Academy ==
IF Karlstad Fotboll operates a youth academy certified by Svensk Elitfotboll (SEF) and ranked among the top 30 academies in Sweden. The annual SEF certification evaluates ten areas of youth development — including coaching quality, player education and the transition pathway to senior football — on a scale of up to 10,000 points across seven star levels. Holding a certified status is significant for an Ettan Norra club, as most participants are from Allsvenskan and Superettan.

The academy is led by Albert Bunjaki, one of the most experienced coaches in Swedish lower-division football. Born in Pristina, Bunjaki came to Sweden in 1991. He subsequently worked as assistant coach at Kalmar FF, Örebro SK and Degerfors IF before being appointed head coach of the Kosovo national team in 2009 — at a time when the country was recognised by neither FIFA nor UEFA. Together with former Sweden assistant Tord Grip, and largely self-funding his scouting journeys, Bunjaki assembled a national squad from players of Kosovar Albanian heritage across Europe, building the programme from nothing. He led the team through their first FIFA World Cup qualifying campaign in 2017, guiding players who have since reached clubs including Napoli (Amir Rrahmani), Real Mallorca (Vedat Muriqi) and Juventus (Edon Zhegrova). Bunjaki served as Karlstad Fotboll's first-team head coach in 2023 before taking up the role of academy director.

=== School partnerships ===
The club partners with two schools in Karlstad to provide structured football development alongside formal education:

- Affärsgymnasiet Sports Academy — from autumn 2026 offers secondary school students two training sessions per week on school time, delivered by Karlstad Fotboll coaches at Våxnäs IP. The training is integrated into the school curriculum and is open to students regardless of club affiliation.
- Solstadens skola — since autumn 2025, primary school pupils train with Karlstad Fotboll coaches on Tuesday and Friday mornings before the school day begins.

== Women's team ==
The women's section competes in Division 1 Mellersta, the third tier of Swedish women's football, having won Division 2 Västra Svealand in 2025 — the highest level in the section's history. The team opened that season with a 10–0 win over Eda IF and clinched the title with two rounds to spare. The long-term ambition is to reach Elitettan, the top division of Swedish women's football. The section is led by sporting director Tobias Johansson and head coach Jonas Rehnberg. Forward Emilia Svensson (born 2007), developed at QBIK, scored 21 goals in 2025 and has been called up repeatedly to the Sweden U17 and U18 national teams. In March 2026 she was selected for U18 duty against Portugal. Her sister Wilma Svensson (born 2008) also plays for the club; their mother, Jessica Svensson, played top-flight women's football with QBIK in 2005. Ahead of the 2026 season, the club absorbed several players from Mallbackens IF following that club's withdrawal from elite women's football, strengthening Karlstad Fotboll's position as the leading women's club in Värmland.

== Notable players ==
=== Players developed at Karlstad Fotboll or its predecessors ===
IF Karlstad Fotboll traces its roots to Karlstad BK, founded in 1923, and Carlstad United BK, which merged into the organisation in 2019. Several players who came through that footballing tradition have gone on to reach higher levels of the professional game.

- Lukas Rhöse (born 2000) — left-back; came through the club's youth system; debuted in Ettan aged 16; joined Kalmar FF in Allsvenskan in 2021; played for Skövde AIK in Superettan; returned to Karlstad Fotboll in 2024; works for infrastructure company Infrakraft while on study leave
- Suleman Zurmati (born 2000) — midfielder; came through the club's youth system; active senior international for Afghanistan; one of few active FIFA international players at Ettan Norra level
- Mathias Karlsson (born 1994) — goalkeeper; a product of the club's goalkeeper development pathway; reserve at Örebro SK in Allsvenskan; started all 60 Superettan matches for Gais (2020–2021), rated among the best aerial goalkeepers in the division; joined Karlstad Fotboll in 2022; heading into 2026 with 97 Ettan Norra appearances for the club
- Jacob Ericsson (born 1993) — left-back; came through the club's youth ranks; progressed to a youth career at AIK; 50 Allsvenskan appearances for Gefle IF (2015–2016) and 55 for Falkenbergs FF (2019–2020); played 134 Ettan Norra matches for Karlstad Fotboll — second in club history; retired from professional football after the 2025 season

=== Players recruited from higher levels ===
- Andreas Bellander (born 1988) — centre-back and central midfielder; joined from Superettan side IK Frej ahead of the 2019 merger and became the club's first captain; the club's all-time appearance record holder (147 Ettan Norra matches, 2019–2025); served as captain for the club's entire Ettan Norra era; now deputy sporting director
- Henrik Bellman (born 1999) — midfielder; vice-captain 2026; career includes FC Copenhagen (where he briefly trained alongside Erling Haaland), Allsvenskan with Östersunds FK (49 appearances), Anderlecht in the Belgian second division, and Superettan with Gefle IF; 36 Sweden youth international appearances (U17, U19) alongside players such as Alexander Isak and Mattias Svanberg; joined Karlstad Fotboll in 2025
- Jesper Carström (born 2002) — forward/winger; developed at GIF Sundsvall; first player born in 2002 to appear in Allsvenskan (2019, aged 17); 4 Allsvenskan and 71 Superettan appearances; Sweden U15, U17 and U19 international; joined Karlstad Fotboll in 2025
- Johan Bengtsson (born 2004) — forward; approximately 80 Superettan appearances for GIF Sundsvall; moved to Portuguese side SC União Torreense in 2025, winning the Portuguese U23 championship; joined Karlstad Fotboll mid-2025; Sweden U15, U18 and U20 international
- Nuha Jatta (born 2003) — defender/midfielder; Superettan debut for Gais aged 16 in 2019; Sweden U17 (9 caps) and U19 (2 caps) international; joined Karlstad Fotboll in 2025
- David Johannesson (born 1986) — striker; Superettan experience with Varbergs BoIS (8 goals, 27 appearances in 2015), Gais and Östers IF; 102 Ettan Norra appearances and 38 goals for Karlstad Fotboll — the club's all-time leading scorer; now works on the club's commercial team and plays for Karlstad City Futsal
- Johan Bertilsson (born 1986) — midfielder with Allsvenskan experience at Degerfors IF; joined Karlstad Fotboll in 2023
- Ibrahim Adewale (born 2006) — striker from Nigeria; 15 goals and 6 assists in 29 competitive appearances in 2025; signed by Allsvenskan and Champions League qualifier Mjällby AIF on a contract through 2030

=== Players associated with predecessor clubs ===
- Gunnar Nordahl — one of Sweden's greatest ever players; five-time Italian Capocannoniere with AC Milan as part of the Gre-No-Li trio; Olympic gold medallist 1948; ended his playing career as player-manager at Karlstads BIK (1959–1961)
- Victor Edvardsen (born 1996) — striker; played for Karlstad BK in 2018; progressed via Degerfors IF and Djurgårdens IF to Dutch Eredivisie club Go Ahead Eagles

== Appearance records ==
Most league appearances in Ettan Norra for IF Karlstad Fotboll (as of end of 2025 season):

#	Player	Position	Appearances	Seasons
1	Andreas Bellander	Defender/Forward	147	2019–2025
2	Jacob Ericsson	Defender	134	2020–2025
3	Agon Beqiri	Midfielder/Forward	107	2021–2024
4	David Johannesson	Forward	102	2020–2023
5	Oscar Kihlgren	Midfielder	101	2020–2024
6	Mathias Karlsson	Goalkeeper	97*	2022–
7	Oskar Alvers	Defender/Midfielder	96*	2020–2025

*Active player, figure as of start of 2026 season. Source: Sportstatistik.nu. Official club figures may differ as they include cup and domestic cup matches.

== Top scorers ==
Most league goals in Ettan Norra for IF Karlstad Fotboll (as of end of 2025 season):

#	Player	Goals	Seasons
1	David Johannesson	38	2020–2023
2	Oskar Alvers	22	2020–2025
3	José Segura Bonilla	18	2021–2025
3	Isaac Edegware Boye	18	2020–2023
5	Agon Beqiri	15	2021–2024
6	Ibrahim Adewale	13	2025
6	Lovette Ansong Ofori	13	2022–2023
8	Elliot Nilsson King	10	2024–2025
8	Andreas Bellander	10	2020–2025

Source: Karlstad Fotboll Magazine 2026. League goals in Ettan Norra only.

== Season by season ==
Season	Level	Division	Section	Position	W	D	L	GF	GA	Pts
2020	Tier 3	Ettan	Norra	8th	10	7	13	53	53	37
2021	Tier 3	Ettan	Norra	4th	18	3	9	62	35	57
2022	Tier 3	Ettan	Norra	5th	12	9	9	49	44	45
2023	Tier 3	Ettan	Norra	8th	12	4	14	41	46	40
2024	Tier 3	Ettan	Norra	6th	14	4	12	51	42	46
2025	Tier 3	Ettan	Norra	5th	16	6	8	64	40	54
2026	Tier 3	Ettan	Norra	—	—	—	—	—	—	—

== Current squad ==
As of 3 September 2026

Note: Flags indicate national team as defined under FIFA eligibility rules; some limited exceptions apply. Players may hold more than one non-FIFA nationality.

No.	Pos.	Nation	Player
1	GK	SWE	Mathias Karlsson
2	DF	SWE	Stevan Beko
6	MF	AFG	Suleman Zurmati ((AFG))
7	MF	SWE	Henrik Bellman ((vice captain))
8	FW	SWE	Adam Bark
9	MF	SWE	Jesper Carström
10	DF	SWE	Oskar Alvers
11	FW	SWE	Johan Bengtsson
12	FW	SWE	William Miguel
14	DF	SWE	Isaac Höök (on loan from Sirius)
15	FW	NED	Lorenzo Maasland
16	FW	SEN	Modou Fall

No.	Pos.	Nation	Player
17	DF	SWE	Nuha Jatta
19	MF	SWE	Elliot Nilsson King ((captain))
20	FW	SWE	Nils Andersson Gärds
21	MF	SWE	Konrad Gustafsson
22	FW	SWE	Kim Käck Ofordu
23	DF	SWE	Lukas Rhöse
24	MF	GAM	Nfansu Dibba
25	FW	SWE	Isak Broström
26	DF	GHA	Banabas Tagoe
27	GK	SWE	Toomas Kocys
28	MF	SRB	Armin Đerlek

== Social responsibility ==
Since 2018, IF Karlstad Fotboll has run the Nattfotboll (Night Football) programme in the Våxnäs district — a free activity for young people aged 13 to 25, held every Friday evening from 21:00 to midnight. The programme began with around 25 participants and has grown to over 100 per session, with approximately 3,000 individual participations per year. It aims to provide a meaningful activity in socioeconomically challenged areas, reduce social exclusion and support integration through sport. The programme is funded through KarlstadHjärtat, a corporate partnership programme with around 20 local businesses, and has ambassadors including Olympic high jump gold medallist Stefan Holm and actor Björn A Ling.
