= Sola Arena =

Multi-purpose hall with a 250-meter velodrome in Sola

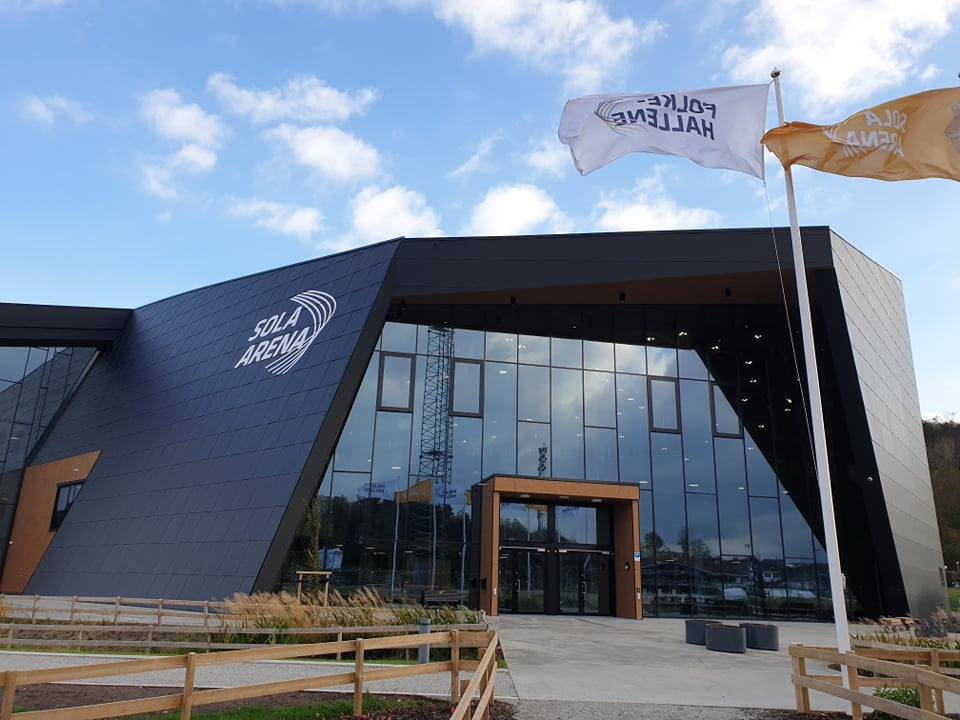
The hall from outside September 2021

Sola Arena, officially Vår Energi Arena Sola due to a sponsorship agreement, is a multi-purpose indoor sports facility featuring a velodrome, located at Åsen near the center of Sola, Norway. It includes, among other amenities, 2500 seats and a 250-meter cycling track certified according to UCI standards (category 2). The arena is situated within the Sola idrettspark, which also includes a football stadium. The central area of Sola Arena can additionally be used for other sports, such as gymnastics or ball games.

== History ==
=== Velodromes in Norway ===
The velodrome in Sola was opened on September 30, 2021, by Minister of Culture Abid Raja, and became the first permanent indoor velodrome in Norway since the track at Dælenenga idrettspark in Oslo was demolished in 1946.

In Norway, outdoor asphalt tracks were established in locations including Levanger in 1961, as well as at the Prestmoen cycling velodrome in Stjørdal in 1976, the Halden Velodrome in 1979, and Valle Hovin in 1977. For the 1993 UCI Track Cycling World Championships, a temporary indoor velodrome was constructed inside the Vikingskipet arena in Hamar, which was dismantled after the championships.

When Sola Arena opened in 2021 it was the country’s only indoor velodrome. After that Asker velodrome has also opened on January 13 2024, which features a 200-meter indoor track.

=== Sola Arena is created ===
Plans for the construction of a cycling track in Sola were developed between 2014 and 2016. The project was commissioned by Folkehallene, an inter-municipal partnership in Rogaland that operates sports facilities in various municipalities across the county. The construction of Sola Arena was financed through lottery proceeds, grants from the state and Rogaland county, donations from SR-Bank, loans, and the “3V” fundraising campaign led by Anne Kristoff (mother of cyclist Alexander Kristoff).

In 2018, a consortium consisting of the Norwegian construction firm Consto (main contractor) and the architectural firm Trollvegg, based in Kristiansand, won the tender for the design and construction of the arena. Sweco provided key consultancy services in structural engineering. The track itself was built by the German company Velotrack. Originally, the arena was scheduled to be inaugurated around the turn of the year 2019/2020, but its completion was delayed until 2021.

=== Norwegian track cycling prior to completion ===
In the years leading up to the opening, the Norwegian track cycling championships had to be held in Poland or Denmark due to a lack of suitable facilities in Norway. Nevertheless, Norway’s Anita Yvonne Stenberg managed to take third place in the points race at the 2020 UCI Track Cycling World Championships, and qualified for the 2021 Summer Olympics in Tokyo where she finished fifth in the omnium. She was honored with a dedicated seat bearing her name at Sola Arena.

=== After opening ===
The Norwegian Championship was held at the new track for the first time in October 2021, and has been held there several times since, as has the Grand Prix Norway.

In February 2022, Folkehallene (which operates five halls in Norway) and the energy supplier Vår Energi entered into a long-term collaboration of ten years with a possible extension.

== Gallery ==
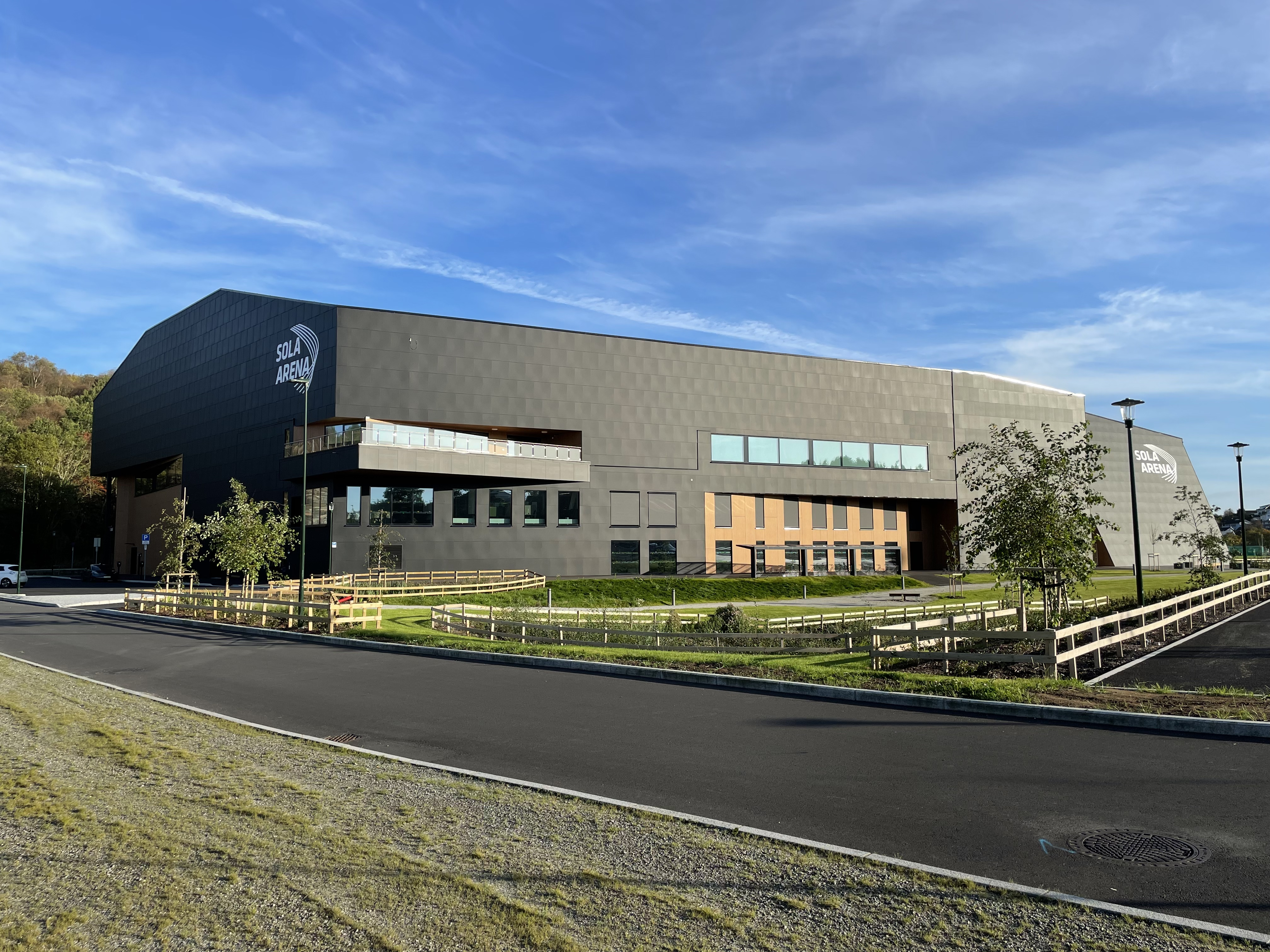
Sola Arena (2021)

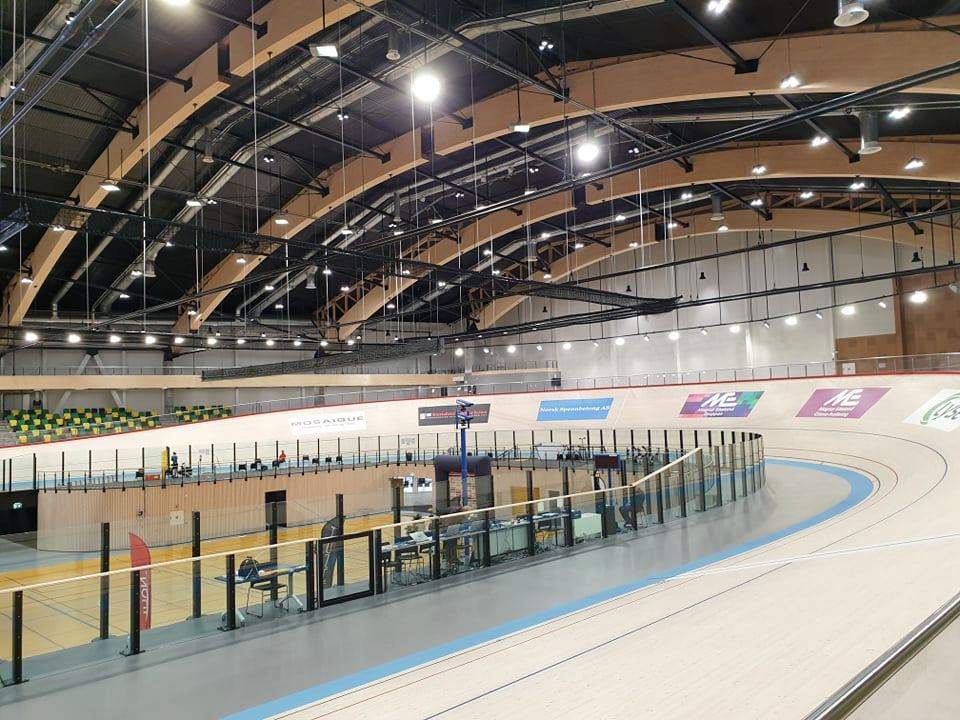
Indoor view

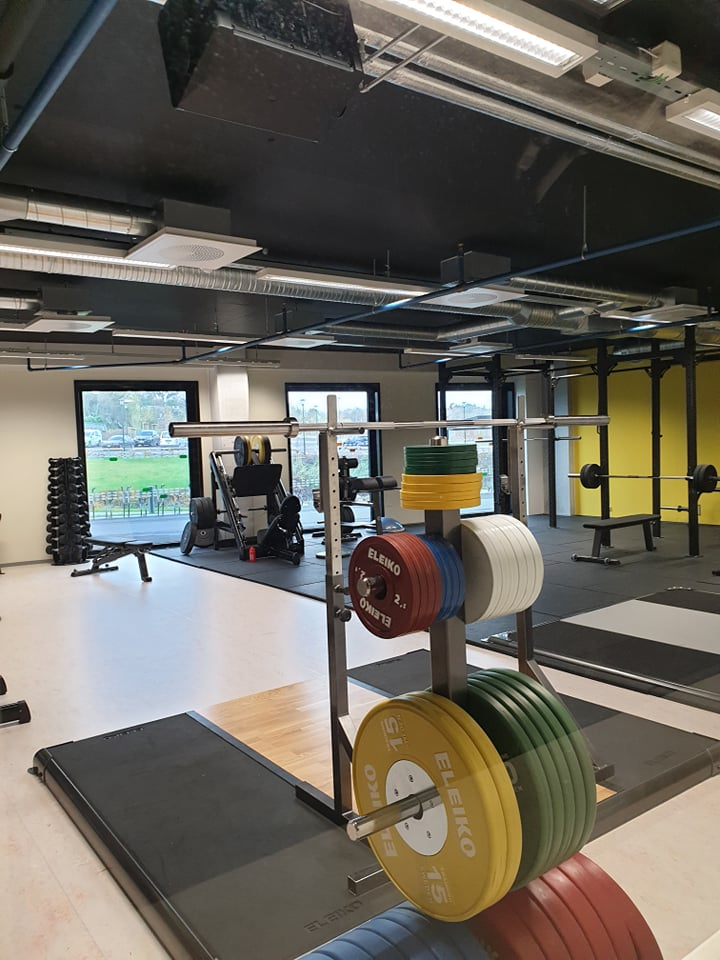
Weight room

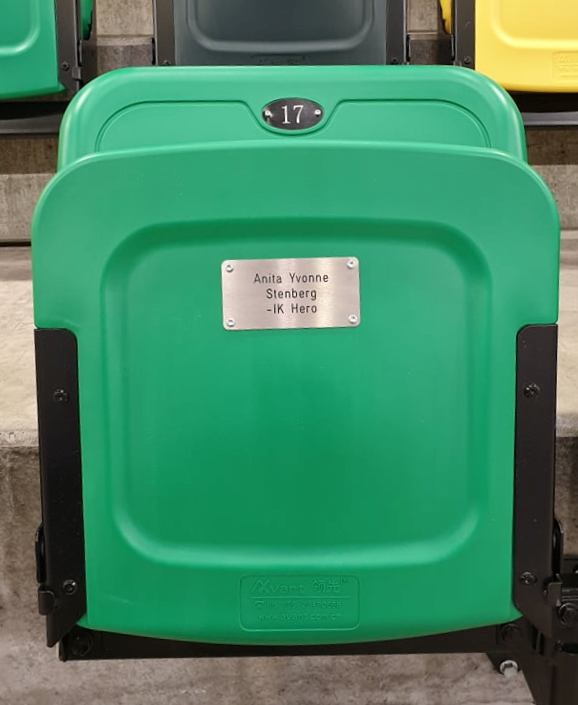
Anita Yvonne Stenberg's seat

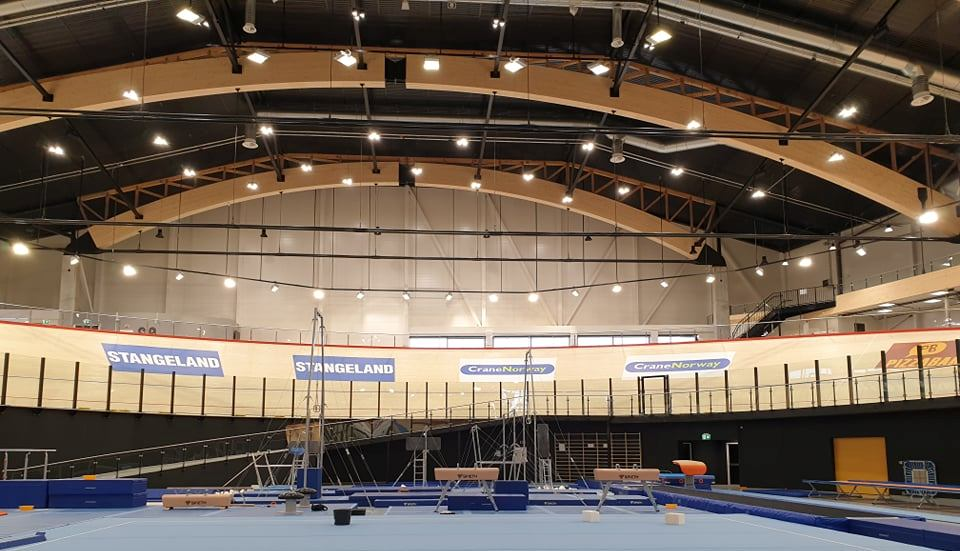
The middle of the hall with gymnastics equipment

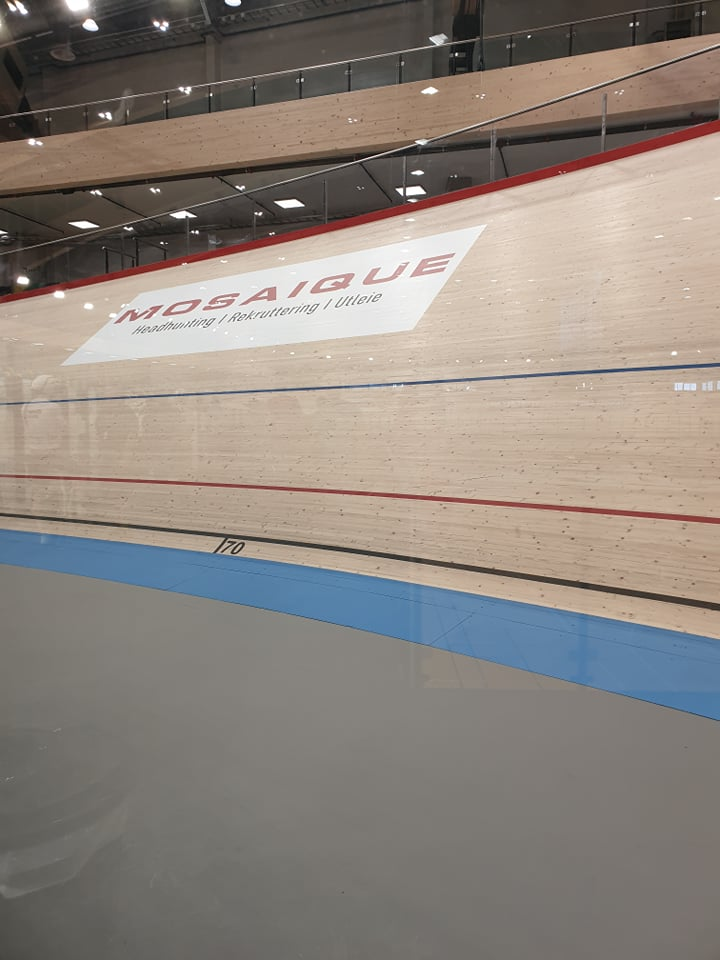
The cycle track
