= Emmanuel Godwin =

Nigerian footballer (born 2005)

Personal information
- Date of birth: 26 May 2005 (age 21)
- Place of birth: Abuja, Nigeria
- Position: Defender

Team information
- Current team: FK Pardubice
- Number: 15

Youth career
- Tripple 44

Senior career*
Years	Team	Apps	(Gls)
2022–2023	Tripple 44	0	(0)
2022	→ Trelleborg (loan)	10	(0)
2023–2025	Trelleborg	52	(0)
2026–	Pardubice	5	(0)
- * Club domestic league appearances and goals as of 12 March 2026

Emmanuel Godwin (born 26 May 2005) is a Nigerian professional footballer who plays as a defender for Czech First League club FK Pardubice.

== Early life and youth career ==
Godwin began his career in Nigeria and later joined Tripple 44 Football Academy, a youth development academy based in Ibadan.

== Club career ==
=== Trelleborg ===
In June 2023, Godwin signed his first professional contract with Swedish club Trelleborgs FF after completing his time with Tripple 44 Academy. Godwin joined the club on a long-term deal and established himself in the first team over the next three years, making 52 appearances in total.

=== FK Pardubice ===
In January 2026, Godwin moved to FK Pardubice on a four-and-a-half-year contract, in the Czech First League. Godwin cited the opportunity to compete at a higher level as having a major influence on his decision to transfer.

== Playing style ==
Godwin's primary position is full-back. He has been noted for his speed, defensive positioning, and ability to contribute in both attack and defence.
