= Henrik Bellman =

Swedish association football player

Personal information
- Date of birth: 24 March 1999 (age 27)
- Place of birth: Sweden
- Height: 1.70 m (5 ft 7 in)
- Position: Midfielder

Team information
- Current team: IF Karlstad
- Number: 7

Youth career
- –2015: HIF Akademi
- 2015–2018: Copenhagen
- 2018–2019: Östersund

Senior career*
Years	Team	Apps	(Gls)
2018–2023	Östersund	64	(2)
2019	→ Levanger (loan)	11	(0)
2023	RSCA Futures	10	(2)
2024	Næstved	2	(0)
2024	Gefle IF	12	(0)
2025–	IF Karlstad	40	(6)

International career
2014	Sweden U15	4	(0)
2015	Sweden U16	9	(1)
2015–2016	Sweden U17	16	(2)
2017	Sweden U18	5	(1)
2017	Sweden U19	3	(1)
- * Club domestic league appearances and goals as of 15 November 2026

Henrik Bellman (born 24 March 1999) is a Swedish footballer who plays as a midfielder for IF Karlstad.

== Club career ==
On 12 January 2023, Bellman signed a contract until the end of the season with RSCA Futures in Belgium. He left the club in the summer of 2023 and remained without a contract until April 2024, when he signed with the Danish 1st Division side Næstved. He left Næstved at the end of the season, which ended with relegation to the 2024-25 Danish 2nd Division.

On July 9, 2024, Superettan side Gefle IF confirmed that Bellman joined the club on a deal until the end of 2025.

On 8 August 2025, Bellman signed a contract with IF Karlstad.
