= Lorenzo Maasland =

Dutch footballer (born 2005)

Personal information
- Date of birth: 25 February 2005 (age 21)
- Place of birth: Rotterdam, Netherlands
- Height: 1.86 m (6 ft 1 in)
- Position: Left winger

Team information
- Current team: IF Karlstad Fotboll
- Number: 15

Youth career
- HVC '10
- FC 's-Gravenzande
- 2017–2024: ADO Den Haag

Senior career*
Years	Team	Apps	(Gls)
2024–2026	ADO Den Haag	14	(0)
2026–	IF Karlstad Fotboll	6	(1)
- * Club domestic league appearances and goals as of 16 November 2026

Lorenzo Maasland (born 25 February 2005) is a Dutch professional footballer who plays as a left winger for IF Karlstad Fotboll in Ettan Norra, the third tier of Swedish football.

== Club career ==
=== ADO Den Haag ===
Maasland played in the youth teams of HVC '10 in Hoek van Holland and FC 's-Gravenzande, before joining the youth academy of ADO Den Haag at the age of 12.

In 2024, he broke into the first team, which competed in the Eerste Divisie. He was part of the senior squad from the start of the season and made his professional debut on 9 October 2024 against TOP Oss in a 5–1 victory. He came on in the 85th minute as a substitute for Daryl van Mieghem.

In December 2024, Maasland signed his first professional contract with the club from The Hague.

In February 2025, Maasland suffered an ankle injury in a home match against Jong Ajax. After recovering, he returned to action for Jong ADO Den Haag, but sustained a serious knee injury — a torn cruciate ligament — early in that match, ruling him out for several months. Despite the setback, Maasland stated he remained positive and intended to return stronger than before. His contract with ADO Den Haag expired in the summer of 2026 and was not renewed.

=== IF Karlstad Fotboll ===
In August 2026, Maasland signed for Swedish third-tier side IF Karlstad Fotboll as a free agent following the expiry of his ADO Den Haag contract. The club had been looking to strengthen after striker Oskar Alvers sustained an injury. Karlstad Fotboll's medical team cleared him before the signing was confirmed. Sporting director Andreas Bellander described him as a player with strong footballing credentials, developed in a demanding professional environment, who had overcome a difficult period of injuries.

== Career statistics ==
As of match played 29 August 2026

Appearances and goals by club, season and competition
Club	Season	League			Cup		Europe		Other		Total	
Club	Season	Division	Apps	Goals	Apps	Goals	Apps	Goals	Apps	Goals	Apps	Goals
ADO Den Haag	2024–25	Eerste Divisie	14	0	0	0	—		—		14	0
IF Karlstad Fotboll	2026	Ettan Norra	0	0	0	0	—		—		0	0
Career total			14	0	0	0	0	0	0	0	14	0
