= Albert Bunjaki =

Kosovan-Swedish football coach

Personal information
- Birth name: Albert Bunjaku
- Date of birth: 18 June 1971 (age 55)
- Place of birth: Pristina, SFR Yugoslavia
- Height: 1.86 m (6 ft 1 in)
- Position: Forward

Team information
- Current team: IF Karlstad (academy director)

Youth career
- 1977–1989: Prishtina

Senior career*
Years	Team	Apps	(Gls)
1990–1991	Prishtina		
1991–1992	Skövde		
1992–1997	IFK Mariestad		
1997–1998	Töreboda IK		
1998–1999	Hassle Torsö GOIF		

Managerial career
- 1998–1999: Hassle Torsö GOIF
- 2000–2002: Tidavads IF
- 2004: Tidaholms G&IF
- 2005: Degerfors IF (assistant)
- 2006–2007: Kalmar FF (assistant)
- 2009–2017: Kosovo
- 2011–2012: Örebro SK U21
- 2019: Feronikeli (advisor)
- 2022: Kosovo U21 (caretaker)
- 2022–2023: IF Karlstad (head coach)
- 2023–: IF Karlstad (academy director)
- * Club domestic league appearances and goals

Albert Bunjaki (born 18 June 1971) is a Kosovan-Swedish football coach and former player. He served as head coach of the Kosovo national team from 2009 to 2017, during which time he built the squad from scratch before the country's admission into UEFA and FIFA. He is currently academy director at Swedish club IF Karlstad.

== Early life and playing career ==
Bunjaki was born and raised in Pristina in what was then SFR Yugoslavia, of Kosovo Albanian descent. He came to Sweden in 1991 and settled in the Skövde region of western Sweden. As a player, he competed at regional and lower-division level in Sweden for clubs including IFK Mariestad and Töreboda IK.

== Managerial career ==
=== Early coaching ===
Bunjaki began his coaching career in the Swedish fifth division with Hassle Torsö GOIF and Tidavads IF, before progressing to Tidaholms G&IF in Division 2 in 2004. In 2005 he joined Degerfors IF as assistant coach, followed by a two-year spell as assistant to Nanne Bergstrand at Kalmar FF (2006–2007).

=== Kosovo national team (2009–2017) ===
On 18 July 2009, Bunjaki was appointed head coach of the Kosovo national team — at a time when Kosovo was not yet recognised by either UEFA or FIFA, meaning the squad had no official status and could not compete in international competition. With no budget and no federation infrastructure to speak of, Bunjaki spent years travelling across Europe at largely his own expense to scout and recruit players of Kosovar Albanian descent, receiving a monthly salary of around 3,000 Swedish kronor during much of this period.

His assistant throughout this period was Tord Grip, the experienced Swedish coach and former assistant to Sven-Göran Eriksson. Grip served alongside Bunjaki for seven years, a collaboration that would later prove decisive for Bunjaki's subsequent career in Sweden.

Kosovo played their first official FIFA-sanctioned match on 5 March 2014 — a 0–0 friendly against Haiti — after years of playing only unofficial matches. Following Kosovo's full admission to UEFA and FIFA in May 2016, the country was placed directly into the 2018 FIFA World Cup qualifying campaign, competing in Group I alongside Croatia, Iceland, Ukraine, Turkey and Finland. Kosovo finished bottom of the group, taking a single point from ten matches — a draw against Finland.

Bunjaki left the role on 7 October 2017, by mutual agreement with the Football Federation of Kosovo, after the final qualifying matches. Despite limited results on the pitch, Bunjaki is widely credited with laying the foundation for a Kosovo side that has since developed into a competitive European football nation — the team that the country he helped build later defeated Sweden in FIFA World Cup 2026 qualifying.

While serving as national coach, Bunjaki was also involved with Örebro SK's U21 setup in 2011–2012.

=== Feronikeli (2019) ===
On 13 November 2019, Bunjaki was appointed as an advisor to Feronikeli, a club in the Kosovo Superleague.

=== IF Karlstad ===
==== Head coach (2022–2023) ====
In December 2022, Bunjaki was appointed head coach of Swedish third-tier club IF Karlstad, a role facilitated by a personal recommendation from Tord Grip to Sven-Göran Eriksson — who was joining the club as sporting director at the same time. Eriksson noted publicly that having worked alongside Grip for seven years was recommendation enough.

Bunjaki described his ambition to build an elite environment at the club, implementing a demanding training schedule that included two early-morning fitness sessions per week. He left the head coaching role in June 2023 after ten league rounds, with the side bottom of the table on eight points, and moved into a newly defined role as academy director.

==== Academy director (2023–present) ====
As academy director, Bunjaki has led the development of IF Karlstad's youth programme. The work received independent recognition from Svensk Elitfotboll (SEF), which conducts annual certification of academy programmes across Swedish elite football clubs. In the 2024 certification — covering ten assessed areas including player development, coaching quality and the pathway from academy to senior football — IF Karlstad was awarded one star and registered a 25 per cent improvement in total score compared to 2023, climbing ten places in the overall ranking among 41 elite clubs. The club passed established names such as Östersund, Falkenberg and Hammarby TFF — while Bunjaki remained the only full-time employee in the academy structure.

The academy works with a bio-banding approach — adapting training to each player's individual biological development rather than their chronological age — and maintains a formal partnership with local schools. Bunjaki also coaches at the club's associated football high school programme one day per week.

In December 2024, Bunjaki extended his contract as academy director with the club.

== Personal life ==
Bunjaki was born in Pristina, SFR Yugoslavia, to Albanian parents originally from Drenas, Kosovo. In 1991, following a conscription call from the Yugoslav People's Army, he refused to serve and left for Sweden, where he subsequently settled in the Karlstad area of Värmland. For refusing conscription, he was sentenced in absentia to 20 years' imprisonment. After arriving in Sweden, he changed his surname from Bunjaku to Bunjaki.
