= Vår Energi =

Norwegian oil and gas company

Vår Energi AS
- Industry: Oil and gas
- Founded: 2018
- Headquarters: Stavanger, Norway
- Key people: Nick Walker (CEO)
- Products: Exploration and production of oil and gas
- Revenue: 2,750,000,000 United States dollar (2019)
- Number of employees: 900 (2022)
- Website: varenergi.no

Vår Energi AS is a Norwegian oil and gas company headquartered in Stavanger, Norway. The company was established in 2018 following the merger between Eni Norway and Point Resources. Vår Energi AS is a publicly traded company listed on Oslo Stock Exchange with Eni as the largest stock holder.

== History ==
The company was established in December 2018 as a result of the merger between Eni Norge and Point Resources AS. Eni Norge was a subsidiary of the Italian oil and gas company Eni, while Point Resources AS was owned by HitecVision, a private equity firm specializing in the energy sector. The merger created one of the largest independent oil and gas companies in Norway, with a production of approximately 300,000 barrels of oil equivalent per day.

In August 2019, Vår Energi AS acquired ExxonMobil's upstream assets in Norway for a total of $4.5 billion. The deal included ownership interests in more than 20 producing fields in the North Sea, including the Grane, Snorre, and Fram fields. The acquisition made Vår Energi AS the second-largest operator on the Norwegian continental shelf, after Equinor.

In July 2026, Vår Energi agreed to acquire BlueNord in a cash-and-share transaction valuing the company at NOK 12.84 billion (US$1.33 billion). The combination was expected to create Europe's largest independent oil and gas producer, with a long-term production target of approximately 450,000 barrels of oil equivalent per day, while Eni would remain its majority shareholder.

== Operations ==
Vår Energi AS is engaged in exploration and production of oil and gas on the Norwegian continental shelf. The company operates several producing fields, including Goliat, the first oil field to start production in the Barents Sea. In addition to its own-operated fields, Vår Energi AS holds interests in several non-operated fields, including Snorre, Grane, and Fram.
