= IF Elfsborg in European football =

Swedish club in European football

Idrottsföreningen Elfsborg, also known simply as IF Elfsborg is a Swedish professional football club based in Borås. The club have participated in 17 editions of the club competitions governed by UEFA, the chief authority for football across Europe.

== European record ==
=== 1960–1980, playing in the UEFA Intertoto Cup and UEFA Cup ===
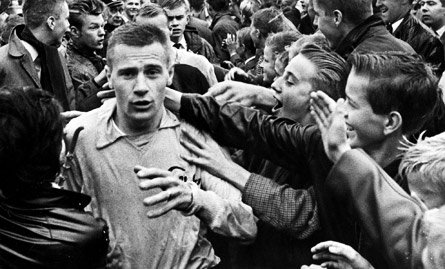
Henry Larsson scored eight goals for IF Elfsborg in their Europe-wide debut in the 1961 Intertoto Cup.

Elfsborg's debut in Europe-wide competition came in 1961, after winning their national championship to qualify for the inaugural 1961–62 International Football Cup (later known as the UEFA Intertoto Cup). Elfsborg's first group stage match-up was against Germany's SC Tasmania 1900 Berlin, which Elfsborg won with scores of 2–3 away and 5–2 at home. Their second match-up was against Swiss team FC Basel, which began with a 1–2 loss at home but a 3–6 win in Basel, on a hat-trick by Henry Larsson. The last match-up was against unbeaten Dutch squad Sparta Rotterdam, with Elfsborg losing 2–5 at home and 4–3 away. Elfsborg finished second in their group, and did not advance to the quarter-finals; Larsson's 8 goals were most in the group, ahead of teammate Lars Råberg's 6 goals. Five years later, in 1966, continued Elfsborg adventures in Europe and the UEFA Intertoto Cup. The first opponent stood the German Borussia Neunkirchen for, a match which Elfsborg won both home and away with a total of 4–1. Second match against VSS Košice became a very different story, they lost 3–0 away and then crushed the opponents with 6–0 at home, after a hat-trick by Roger Carlsson. In the final group stage match against leaders Vorwärts Berlin was lost with 2–0 in both matches which meant that Elfsborg finally ended as third in the group.

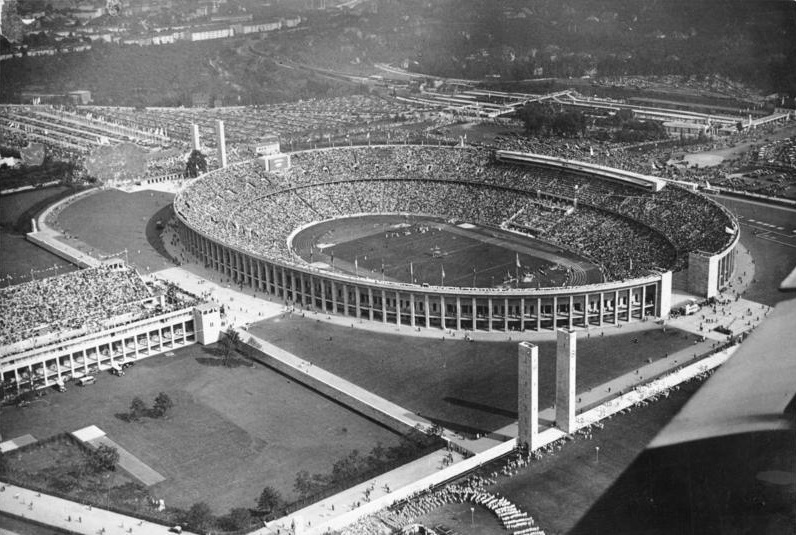
IF Elfsborg lost against Hertha BSC in the first round of the 1971–72 UEFA Cup, at Olympiastadion in Berlin.

Also the following year 1967 played Elfsborg in the UEFA Intertoto Cup where they in the first group stage match met the German club Werder Bremen. The first match ended in a 4–1 loss away, but the second game ended with a draw 2–2 at home. In the second game stood the Polish team Polonia Bytom for, where Elfsborg lost in both matches. But in the last match against the Swiss Grasshopper Club Zürich Elfsborg would take a memorable scalp, when they beat them at home with 5–2 after a hat-trick by Lars Heinemann. The return ended in a 3–1 loss and Elfsborg finished again in third place in the group. 1971 was a bad year out in Europe for Elfsborg, they met the teams Stal Mielec, Tatran Prešov and Vejle BK. They lost every game except against the Danish Vejle BK where they won both games with a total of 8–0, and once again Elfsborg ended as third in their group. The year after 1972 played Elfsborg in the UEFA Cup for the first time against the classic German champions Hertha Berlin in the first round, they lost with 3–1 at Olympic Stadium and with 1–4 at home.

1975 was Elfsborg worst year in European competition and the UEFA Intertoto Cup when they finished last in the group after you have met teams as FC Baník Ostrava, Celik Zenica and Vitoria Setubal. Elfsborg still managed to win at home against Baník Ostrava with 3–1 at home and a tie against Vitoria Setubal. In 1978, Elfsborg participated once again in the UEFA Intertoto Cup and this year was slightly better than the last in 1975, Elfsborg won with a total of 5–3 against Norwegian Lillestrøm SK, and then a win against former Yugoslav Sloboda Tuzla. But against the big giant Israeli Maccabi Netanya F.C. Elfsborg could not compete with, and lost the first game with 7–1 away but managed with a draw at home, 2–2. In 1978 was Elfsborg in the UEFA Cup for the second time when they stood against the French sovereigns RC Strasbourg. The first meeting won Elfsborg surprisingly with 2–0 at home, but in the returning game they lost with 4–1 in front of 31 000 spectators.

=== 1980–2000, many years outside European football ===
1980, became Elfsborg best year ever in the UEFA Intertoto Cup when they won their group and became the winner of the tournament. This after they first won against FK Napredak Kruševac with a total of 4–2 and then against Slavia Sofia with a total of 3–1. German VfL Bochum became more difficult when the loss in the first meeting with 2–1 and then changed with a win at home 1–0, this meant that Elfsborg ended up as number one in their group. The following year, 1981, did Elfsborg participate in the UEFA Cup where they faced Scottish St Mirren F.C. The first match ended in a 1–2 loss at home who then followed up with a draw 0–0 in Scotland. 1983 Elfsborg would make their penultimate appearance in the UEFA Intertoto Cup, when they stood against the teams TJ Vítkovice, Trakia Plovdiv and Eintracht Braunschweig. It was a bad adventure where they only managed to win against German Eintracht Braunschweig with 1–0 at home and play a draw against Trakia Plovdiv, this meant that Elfsborg finished as last in their group. Despite the poor performance 1983, they managed to reach the UEFA Cup, 1984, where the opponents was Polish team Widzew Łódź, before 30 000 spectators played Elfsborg a draw away against Łódź, 0–0, also at home playing a heroic game with a draw 2–2 and but Łódź advanced furthermore, after more away goals.

=== 2000–present ===
It would take almost 20 years before Elfsborg would participate in the European cups again, after the heaviest period in the club's history Elfsborg was now back at the top layer of Allsvenskan and participated in the UEFA Cup in 2001 after they won the national cup. They stood against JK Trans Narva in the first round, where they won with 1–3 away and then also won with 5–0 at home after a hat-trick by Stefan Andreasson. The second round was against one of the Polish giants Legia Warsaw where Elfsborg lost with a total of 10–2. After winning national cup once again, Elfsborg participated in the UEFA Cup in 2004 where the opponents in the first round was Glentoran FC who were beaten with a total of 3–1, in the next round Elfsborg stood against Croatian team NK Dinamo Zagreb, Elfsborg lost the first game away with 2–0 and then played a draw at home 0–0. After winning national championship in 2006 got Elfsborg for the first time participate in the UEFA Champions League. This occurred in 2007 when the first round was against Linfield FC where Elfsborg in the first match played a draw 0–0. To then win at home with 1–0 after a goal by Mathias Svensson. The second round was against Hungarian Debreceni VSC where they won away with 1–0 after a goal by Daniel Mobaeck. They secured promotion to the third round by playing 0–0 at home. The third round was against Spanish giants Valencia CF, where 50 000 spectators at the Mestalla Stadium saw Elfsborg lose with 3–0 after including goal by David Silva. Back at Borås Arena Elfsborg lost again with 2–1 after goals by Daniel Alexandersson and David Villa with Valencia's decisive 2–1 goal.

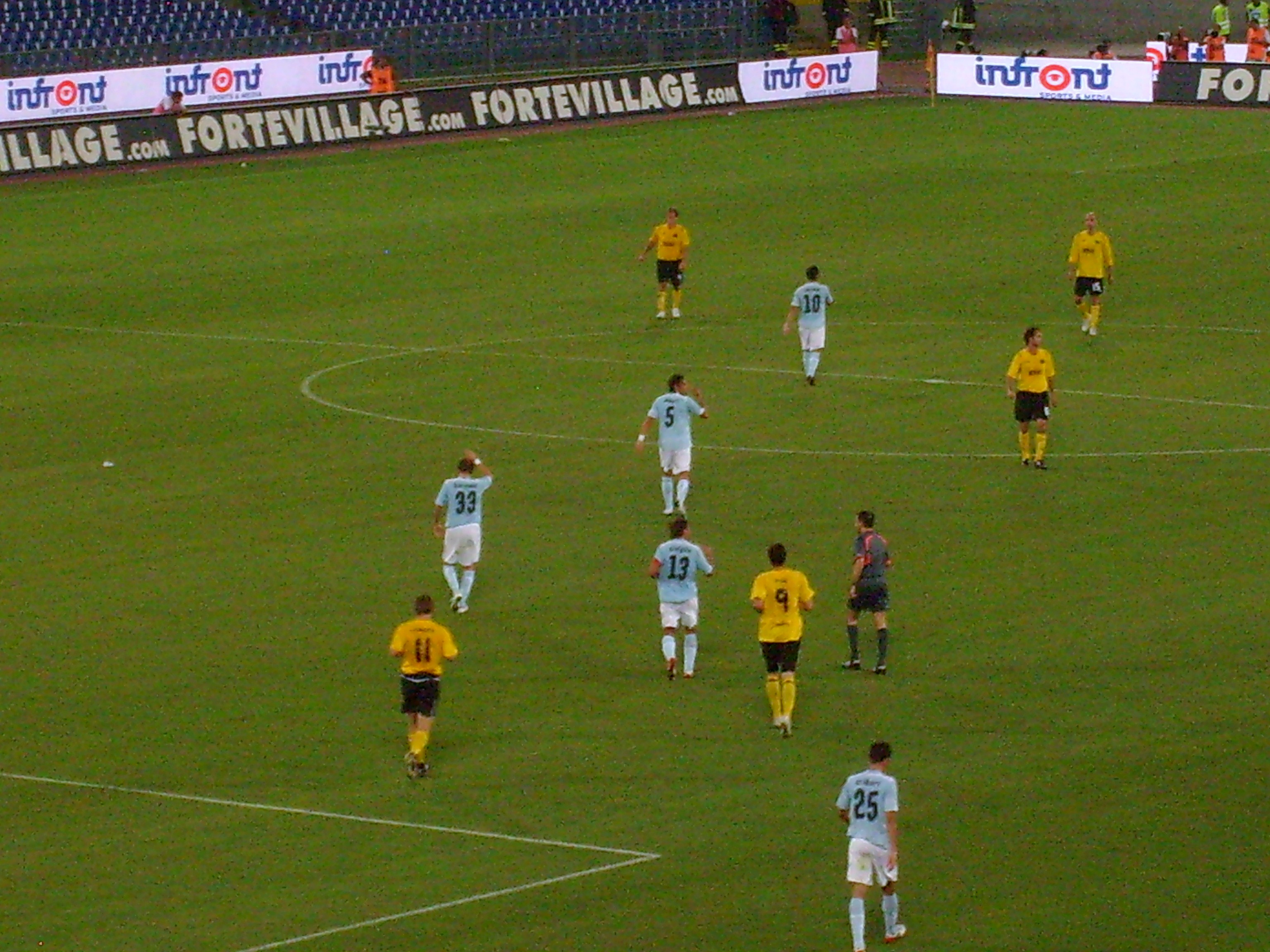
S.S Lazio–Elfsborg at the Stadio Olimpico in Rome, Europa League play-off 2009.

After the excellent results in the UEFA Champions League became Elfsborg directly qualified for the 2007–08 UEFA Cup group stage where they stood against the teams FC Dinamo Bucuresti, AEK Athens, ACF Fiorentina, FK Mladá Boleslav and Villarreal CF. Elfsborg managed to win against FC Dinamo Bucuresti with 2–1 and a draw against AEK Athens, 1–1. The following year 2008 achieved Elfsborg for the last time winning the UEFA Intertoto Cup by beating teams HB Torshavn with a total of 2–1, Hibernian FC with a total of 4–0 and FK Riga with a total of 1–0. Which meant that they finished as group winners. That same year they also played UEFA Cup last time 2008–09 UEFA Cup when it was against the Irish St Patrick's Athletic F.C. but lost surprisingly with a total of 4–3. In 2009 Elfsborg started for the first time playing in the UEFA Europa League where they in the second round stood against Szombathelyi Haladás as they were defeated with a total of 3–0. In the third round was against Portuguese 2010–11 UEFA Europa League finalists SC Braga, as they surprisingly managed to beat them after a completely heroic win by a total of 4–1. In the final play-off round Elfsborg stood against classic S.S. Lazio where they in the first meeting lost with 3–0 and then again after a heroic effort managed to win with 1–0 after a goal by Denni Avdic.

Also the year after 2010 played Elfsborg in the UEFA Europa League where they stood against FC Iskra-Stal in the second round and won with the total of 3–1. The third round was against FK Teteks from Macedonia, a team that Elfsborg won easily against with a total of 7–1. The play-off round was once again against Italian club SSC Napoli. Elfsborg succeeded after a heroic performance by goalkeeper Jesper Christiansen to get away from the Stadio San Paolo with a 1–0 loss. Back at the Borås Arena Elfsborg lost anyway with 2–0 after two goals by Edinson Cavani who got his big breakthrough in this match. In 2011 Elfsborg played in the UEFA Europa League for the third consecutive year, and stood against CS Fola Esch in the first round which they won with a total of 5–1. The second round was against FK Suduva where they won easily with a total of 4–1. But in the third round Elfsborg lost surprisingly against the Norwegian Aalesunds FK with a total of 5–1 and failed to reach the play-offs. The same thing happened the year after in 2012. Even if Elfsborg had a perfect start in the qualification by winning a home game in the first stage against Floriana F.C. with 8–0, the biggest international victory in Elfsborg's history. The away game was just as easy, Elfsborg won with 5–0 and with a total of 13–0. In the second stage were the opponents FC Dacia Chişinău and Elfsborg lost the first game after a weak effort with 1–0. But managed to win easy at Borås Arena with 2–0 and therefore advanced to the third stage. In the third stage it would be a Scandinavian battle, since the opponents were Danish AC Horsens. The first away game ended with a draw, 1–1, after Horsens received a penalty in added time. But in the home they lost 2–3 and as in the previous year, Elfsborg failed to reach the play-offs.

== Key ==
- S = Seasons
- Pld = Played
- W = Games won
- D = Games drawn
- L = Games lost
- GF = Goals for
- GA = Goals against
- GD = Goal difference
- H = Home ground
- A = Away ground
- N = Neutral ground
- Final = Final
- SF = Semi-finals
- QF = Quarter-finals
- Group = Group stage
- PO = Play-off round
- 3R = Round 3
- 2R = Round 2
- 1R = Round 1
- 3QR = Third qualification round
- 2QR = Second qualification round
- 1QR = First qualification round
- QR = Qualification round
- aet = Match determined after extra time
- ag = Match determined by away goals rule
- ap = Match determined by penalty shoot-out
- Agg = Aggregated score
- Ref = Reference

Elfsborg's score is noted first in all of the match results given below.

== Overall record ==
=== By competition ===
As of 10 July 2015

Tournament	Pld	W	D	L	GF	GA	GD
European Cup/UEFA Champions League	10	4	3	3	14	7	+7
UEFA Cup/UEFA Europa League	118	48	22	48	184	162	+22
Total	128	52	25	51	198	169	+29

== Club ranking ==
As of 22 June 2015

Rank	Team	Points
147	(Russia) FC Rostov	11.599
148	(Russia) Alania Vladikavkaz	11.599
149	(Russia) Sibir Novosibirsk	11.599
150	(Sweden) IF Elfsborg	11.545
151	(Azerbaijan) Qarabağ FK	11.500
152	(Switzerland) Grasshopper	11.375
153	(Croatia) Hajduk Split	11.200

== Matches ==
As of 22 June 2015

=== UEFA Champions League ===
Season	Stage	Opponent		Date	Venue	Score	Agg	Ref
Season	Stage	Team	Country	Date	Venue	Score	Agg	Ref
European Cup
UEFA Champions League
2007–08	1QR	Linfield F.C.	Northern Ireland	17 July 2007	Windsor Park, Belfast	0–0	1–0	
2007–08	1QR	Linfield F.C.	Northern Ireland	25 July 2007	Borås Arena, Borås	1–0	1–0	
2007–08	2QR	Debreceni VSC	Hungary	31 July 2007	Stadion Oláh Gábor Út, Debrecen	1–0	1–0	
2007–08	2QR	Debreceni VSC	Hungary	8 August 2007	Borås Arena, Borås	0–0	1–0	
2007–08	3QR	Valencia CF	Spain	14 August 2007	Mestalla Stadium, Valencia	0–3	1–5	
2007–08	3QR	Valencia CF	Spain	29 August 2007	Borås Arena, Borås	1–2	1–5	
2013–14	2QR	FC Daugava	Latvia	17 July 2013	Borås Arena, Borås	7–1	11–1	
2013–14	2QR	FC Daugava	Latvia	23 July 2013	Daugava, Daugavpils	4–0	11–1	
2013–14	3QR	Celtic	Scotland	31 July 2013	Celtic Park, Glasgow	0–1	0–1	
2013–14	3QR	Celtic	Scotland	7 August 2013	Borås Arena, Borås	0–0	0–1	

=== UEFA Europa League ===
Season	Stage	Opponent		Date	Venue	Score	Agg	Ref
Season	Stage	Team	Country	Date	Venue	Score	Agg	Ref
UEFA Cup
1971–72	1R	Hertha Berlin	West Germany	15 September 1971	Olympic Stadium, Berlin	1–3	2–7	
1971–72	1R	Hertha Berlin	West Germany	29 September 1971	Ryavallen, Borås	1–4	2–7	
1978–79	1R	RC Strasbourg	France	13 September 1978	Ryavallen, Borås	2–0	3–4	
1978–79	1R	RC Strasbourg	France	27 September 1978	Stade de la Meinau, Strasbourg	1–4	3–4	
1980–81	1R	St Mirren F.C.	Scotland	17 September 1980	Ryavallen, Borås	1–2	1–2	
1980–81	1R	St Mirren F.C.	Scotland	1 October 1980	St Mirren Park, Paisley	0–0	1–2	
1983–84	1R	Widzew Łódź	Poland	14 September 1983	Municipal Stadium, Białystok	0–0	2–2(a)	
1983–84	1R	Widzew Łódź	Poland	19 September 1983	Ryavallen, Borås	2–2	2–2(a)	
2001–02	QR	JK Narva Trans	Estonia	9 August 2001	A. Le Coq Arena, Tallinn	0–3	5–3	
2001–02	QR	JK Narva Trans	Estonia	23 August 2001	Ryavallen, Borås	5–0	5–3	
2001–02	1R	Legia Warsaw	Poland	20 September 2001	Stadion Wojska Polskiego, Warsaw	1–4	2–10	
2001–02	1R	Legia Warsaw	Poland	27 September 2001	Ryavallen, Borås	1–6	2–10	
2004–05	QR	Glentoran F.C.	Northern Ireland	12 August 2004	The Oval, Belfast	1–0	3–1	
2004–05	QR	Glentoran F.C.	Northern Ireland	26 August 2004	Ryavallen, Borås	2–1	3–1	
2004–05	1R	Dinamo Zagreb	Croatia	16 September 2004	Stadion Maksimir, Zagreb	0–2	0–2	
2004–05	1R	Dinamo Zagreb	Croatia	30 September 2004	Ryavallen, Borås	0–0	0–2	
2007–08	1R	FC Dinamo București	Romania	20 September 2007	Stadionul Lia Manoliu, Bucharest	1–2	2–2(a)	
2007–08	1R	FC Dinamo București	Romania	4 October 2007	Borås Arena, Borås	0–1	2–2(a)	
2007–08	GS	AEK Athens	Greece	25 October 2007	Borås Arena, Borås	1–1	5th	
2007–08	GS	ACF Fiorentina	Italy	8 November 2007	Stadio Artemio Franchi, Florence	1–6	5th	
2007–08	GS	FK Mladá Boleslav	Czech Republic	29 November 2007	Borås Arena, Borås	1–3	5th	
2007–08	GS	Villarreal CF	Spain	5 December 2007	El Madrigal, Villarreal	0–2	5th	
2008–09	2QR	St Patrick's Athletic F.C.	Ireland	14 August 2008	Borås Arena, Borås	2–2	3–4	
2008–09	2QR	St Patrick's Athletic F.C.	Ireland	28 August 2008	Richmond Park, Dublin	3–4	3–4	
UEFA Europa League
2009–10	2QR	Haladas FC	Hungary	16 July 2009	Borås Arena, Borås	3–0	3–0	
2009–10	2QR	Haladas FC	Hungary	23 July 2009	Rohonci út, Szombathely	0–0	3–0	
2009–10	3QR	SC Braga	Portugal	30 July 2009	Municipal, Braga	2–1	4–1	
2009–10	3QR	SC Braga	Portugal	6 August 2009	Borås Arena, Borås	2–0	4–1	
2009–10	PO	S.S. Lazio	Italy	20 August 2009	Stadio Olimpico, Rome	0–3	1–3	
2009–10	PO	S.S. Lazio	Italy	27 August 2009	Borås Arena, Borås	1–0	1–3	
2010–11	2QR	FC Iskra-Stal	Moldova	15 July 2010	Borås Arena, Borås	2–1	3–1	
2010–11	2QR	FC Iskra-Stal	Moldova	22 July 2010	Sheriff, Tiraspol	1–0	3–1	
2010–11	3QR	FK Teteks	Macedonia	29 July 2010	Borås Arena, Borås	5–0	7–1	
2010–11	3QR	FK Teteks	Macedonia	5 August 2010	Filip II Arena, Skopje	2–1	7–1	
2010–11	PO	S.S.C. Napoli	Italy	19 August 2010	Stadio San Paolo, Naples	0–1	0–3	
2010–11	PO	S.S.C. Napoli	Italy	26 August 2010	Borås Arena, Borås	0–2	0–3	
2011–12	1QR	CS Fola Esch	Luxembourg	30 June 2011	Borås Arena, Borås	4–0	5–1	
2011–12	1QR	CS Fola Esch	Luxembourg	7 July 2011	La Frontière, Esch-sur-Alzette	1–1	5–1	
2011–12	2QR	FK Sūduva	Lithuania	14 July 2011	Sūduva Stadium, Marijampolė	1–1	4–1	
2011–12	2QR	FK Sūduva	Lithuania	21 July 2011	Borås Arena, Borås	3–0	4–1	
2011–12	3QR	Aalesunds FK	Norway	28 July 2011	Aalesund Stadion, Ålesund	0–4	1–5	
2011–12	3QR	Aalesunds FK	Norway	4 August 2011	Borås Arena, Borås	1–1	1–5	
2012–13	1QR	Floriana F.C.	Malta	5 July 2012	Borås Arena, Borås	8–0	12–0	
2012–13	1QR	Floriana F.C.	Malta	10 July 2012	Hibernians Ground, Corradino	4–0	12–0	
2012–13	2QR	FC Dacia Chişinău	Moldova	19 July 2012	Zimbru Stadium, Chișinău	0–1	2–1	
2012–13	2QR	FC Dacia Chişinău	Moldova	26 July 2012	Borås Arena, Borås	2–0	2–1	
2012–13	3QR	AC Horsens	Denmark	2 August 2012	Horsens Idraetspark, Horsens	1–1	3–4	
2012–13	3QR	AC Horsens	Denmark	9 August 2012	Borås Arena, Borås	1–2	3–4	
2013–14	PO	FC Nordsjælland	Denmark	22 August 2013	Borås Arena, Borås	1–1	2–1	
2013–14	PO	FC Nordsjælland	Denmark	29 August 2013	Farum Park, Farum	1–0	2–1	
2013–14	GS	Red Bull Salzburg	Austria	19 September 2013	Stadion Salzburg, Salzburg	0–4	3rd	
2013–14	GS	Standard de Liège	Belgium	3 October 2013	Borås Arena, Borås	1–1	3rd	
2013–14	GS	Esbjerg fB	Denmark	24 October 2013	Borås Arena, Borås	1–2	3rd	
2013–14	GS	Esbjerg fB	Denmark	7 November 2013	Esbjerg Stadium, Esbjerg	0–1	3rd	
2013–14	GS	Red Bull Salzburg	Austria	28 November 2013	Borås Arena, Borås	0–1	3rd	
2013–14	GS	Standard de Liège	Belgium	12 December 2013	Stade Maurice Dufrasne, Liège	3–1	3rd	
2014–15	2QR	Inter Baku PIK	Azerbaijan	17 July 2014	Borås Arena, Borås	0–1	5–4(p)	
2014–15	2QR	Inter Baku PIK	Azerbaijan	24 July 2014	Shafa Stadium, Baku	1–0	5–4(p)	
2014–15	3QR	FH	Iceland	31 July 2014	Borås Arena, Borås	4–1	5–3	
2014–15	3QR	FH	Iceland	7 August 2014	Kaplakriki, Hafnarfjörður	1–2	5–3	
2014–15	PO	Rio Ave	Portugal	21 August 2014	Borås Arena, Borås	2–1	2–2(a)	
2014–15	PO	Rio Ave	Portugal	28 August 2014	Estádio do Rio Ave FC, Vila do Conde	0–1	2–2(a)	
2015–16	1QR	FC Lahti	Finland	2 July 2015	Lahden Stadion, Lahti	2–2	7–2	
2015–16	1QR	FC Lahti	Finland	9 July 2015	Borås Arena, Borås	5–0	7–2	
2015–16	2QR	Randers FC	Denmark	16 July 2015	Viborg Stadion, Viborg	0–0	1–0	
2015–16	2QR	Randers FC	Denmark	21 July 2015	Borås Arena, Borås	1–0 (a.e.t)	1–0	
2015–16	3QR	Odd	Norway	30 July 2015	Borås Arena, Borås	2–1	2-3	
2015–16	3QR	Odd	Norway	6 August 2015	Skagerak Arena, Skien	0-2	2-3	
2024–25	1QR	Pafos	Cyprus	11 July 2024	Borås Arena, Borås	3–0	8–2	
2024–25	1QR	Pafos	Cyprus	18 July 2024	Alphamega Stadium, Limassol	5–2	8–2	
2024–25	2QR	Sheriff Tiraspol	Moldova	25 July 2024	Sheriff Arena, Tiraspol	1–0	3–0	
2024–25	2QR	Sheriff Tiraspol	Moldova	1 August 2024	Borås Arena, Borås	2–0	3–0	
2024–25	3QR	Rijeka	Croatia	8 August 2024	Stadion Rujevica, Rijeka	1–1	4-1	
2024–25	3QR	Rijeka	Croatia	15 August 2024	Borås Arena, Borås	2-0	4-1	
2024–25	PO	Molde	Norway	22 August 2024	Aker Stadium, Molde	0–1		

=== UEFA Intertoto Cup ===
Season	Stage	Opponent		Date	Venue	Score	Agg	Ref
Season	Stage	Team	Country	Date	Venue	Score	Agg	Ref
2008	1R	HB Torshavn	Faroe Islands	22 June 2008	Gundadalur, Tórshavn	4–1	4–1	
2008	1R	HB Torshavn	Faroe Islands	28 June 2008	Borås Arena, Borås	0–0	4–1	
2008	2R	Hibernian F.C.	Scotland	6 July 2008	Easter Road, Edinburgh	2–0	4–0	
2008	2R	Hibernian F.C.	Scotland	12 July 2008	Borås Arena, Borås	2–0	4–0	
2008	3R	FK Rīga	Latvia	19 July 2008	Borås Arena, Borås	1–0	1–0	
2008	3R	FK Rīga	Latvia	28 July 2008	Daugava, Liepāja	0–0	1–0	
